= La Recherche photographique =

French academic journal of studies in photography

- Editor: André Rouillé
- Categories: Photography aesthetics and history
- Frequency: biannual
- Publisher: Paris Audiovisuel and the University of Paris VIII
- Founder: Jean-Luc Monterosso and Christian Mayaud
- Founded: 1986
- First issue: October 1, 1986; 39 years ago
- Final issue Number: May 1, 1997 no. 20, Mar/May 2000
- Country: France
- Based in: Paris
- Language: French
- ISSN: 0983-8430

La Recherche photographique: histoire-esthétique was a specialised peer-reviewed bi-annual French journal, published from September 1986 to spring 1997, and edited by Paris Audiovisuel and the University of Paris 8.

== Foundation ==
In 1980, Jean-Luc Monterosso (born in 1947), president of Paris Audiovisuel and founder/director of the Maison Européenne de la Photographie, and who created the Mois de Photo in Paris and the Grand Prix Paris Match for photojournalism (with Roger Thérond), in 1986 founded the magazine La Recherche photographique with Christian Mayaud of Université Paris VIII.

== Context ==
The magazine, like its earlier-established contemporary Les Cahiers de la photographie, emerged in a lively decade for the medium and its critique, breaking with strong traditions of the Beaux Arts in France which had hindered photography's acceptance as a legitimate subject of art historical research until the late 1970s, when the first courses on the history of photography were commenced by Michel Frizot at the University of Dijon and the University Paris-Sorbonne.

This late academic attention to the medium (as compared to North America, and other European countries), arriving in the early 1980s, meant that the field of photographic studies in France incorporated perspectives and methodologies outside traditional art history, including semiology (Roland Barthes), sociology (Pierre Bourdieu), and psychoanalysis (François Soulages).

Support from the socialist government of François Mitterrand and its cultural minister, Jack Lang, to promote photography on a national scale, resulted in the foundation of the Centre Pompidou in 1977 and Paris Audiovisuel (co-publisher of La Recherche photographique) in 1978, the inauguration of the Musée Nationale d'Art Moderne photography collection and establishment of its Cabinet de la Photographie in 1981; contemporary with the Musée d'Orsay's own in 1978; added to Jean-Claude Lemagny's expansion of the collection at the BnF (1971 onward); and encouraged publications on the medium in France of this decade of the 1980s; the book (translated from Italian) by Franco Vaccari, Photography and the technological unconscious in 1981; Hervé Guibert's 1981 L'Image fantôme, the translation of Susan Sontag's, On photography, released in 1982 (from the English original, 1977); Michel Foucault's sole treatise on photography Thought and Emotion (1982); Denis Roche's La Disparition des lucioles also in 1982; Henri Van Lier's Philosophie de la photographie of 1983; Lemagny's La Photographie Créative, 1984; Gaston Fernandez Carrera's, La Photographie, le néant, 1986; Jean-Marie Schaeffer's L'Image Précaire, 1987; and American art critic Rosalind Krauss Le Photographique: pour une théorie des écarts published directly in French (there was no American edition) in 1990, ten years after Roland Barthes' seminal book, Camera Lucida.

== History ==
The partners Monterosso and Mayaud entrusted the revue's chief editorship to André Rouillé, a Marxist historian, formally an LCR activist, who produced studies on photographic history during the 1980s. Rouillé wrote L' Empire de la photographie 1839-1870 (1982), a study of photography and capitalism in nineteenth-century France; Le Corps et son Image: Photographies du dix-neuvième siècle (1986) drawing on images from the Bibliothèque Nationale, to look at the body in French photography: the labouring body; law enforcement, medical imagery, and photographs of dead Communards. With Jean-Claude Lemagny he edited Histoire de la photographie in which he wrote a chapter "The rise of photography (1851-70); Exploring the world by photography in the nineteenth century".

As editor of the journal Rouillé developed some original work, but was increasingly preoccupied with contemporary "creative" photography, before moving away for a few years from the disciplinary field to orient his activity towards electronic media and cultural information.

Twenty issues were published, each one devoted to a different theme for which the editorial team conducted peer reviews of the submissions, which at the time represented a unique approach. Among the subjects thus explored were: the links between cinema and photography (1987), war photography (1989), erotic photography (1988), Japanese photography (1990), "the shadow" (1991), Roland Barthes and photography (1992).

== Personnel ==
- Editor-in-chief: André Rouillé
- Editorial director: Dominique Baqué
- Editorial board: Pierre Bonhomme, Anne Cartier-Bresson, Alain Desvergnes, Catherine Flochlay, André Gunthert, Bernard Marbot and Françoise Reynaud.

== Legacy ==
La Recherche photographique was still, in 2018, recommended as a text by the University of Paris 8.
