= Les cahiers de la photographie =

French journal of photographic criticism and theory

- Editor: Gilles Mora
- Categories: Photography aesthetics and history, computer art, cinematography, videography
- Frequency: trimestrial, intermittent
- Format: 21 x 14 cm
- Publisher: Claude Nori, Laplume: Association de critique contemporaine en photographie (ACCP)
- Founder: Claude Nori, Bernard Plossu, Gilles Mora
- Founded: 1981
- First issue: January 1, 1981; 45 years ago
- Final issue Number: April 1, 1994 n°30 1994
- Company: Éditions Contrejour
- Country: France
- Based in: Marmande (Lot-et-Garonne, France)
- Language: French
- ISSN: 0294-4081

Les cahiers de la photographie, published between 1981 and 1994, was a French magazine devoted to photography with the goal of promoting criticism of contemporary photography.

== Ethos ==
Les cahiers de la photographie, modelled on the earlier Cahiers du cinèma and published by Laplume and the Association de critique contemporaine en photographie (ACCP), was a review of critical and theoretical works on contemporary photography, the first of this period in France from 1981 to 1990, earlier than and running contemporary with, La Recherche photographique which covered the full duration of photographic history.

== Context ==
The magazine emerged in a lively decade for the medium and its critique, breaking with strong traditions of the Beaux Arts in France which had hindered photography's acceptance as a legitimate subject of art historical research until the late 1970s, when the first courses on the history of photography were commenced by Michel Frizot at the University of Dijon and the University Paris-Sorbonne.

This late academic attention to the medium (as compared to North America, and other European countries), arriving in the early 1980s, meant that the field of photographic studies in France incorporated perspectives and methodologies outside traditional art history, including semiology (Roland Barthes), sociology (Pierre Bourdieu), and psychoanalysis (François Soulages).

Support from the socialist government of François Mitterrand and its cultural minister, Jack Lang, to promote photography on a national scale, resulted in the foundation of the Centre Pompidou in 1977, the inauguration of the Musée Nationale d'Art Moderne photography collection and establishment of its Cabinet de la Photographie in 1981; contemporary with the Musée d'Orsay's own in 1978; added to Jean-Claude Lemagny's expansion of the collection at the BnF (1971 onward); and encouraged publications on the medium in France of this decade of the 1980s; the book (translated from Italian) by Franco Vaccari, Photography and the technological unconscious in 1981; Hervé Guibert's 1981 L'Image fantôme, the translation of Susan Sontag's, On photography, released in 1982 (from the English original, 1977); Michel Foucault's sole treatise on photography Thought and Emotion (1982); Denis Roche's La Disparition des lucioles also in 1982; Henri Van Lier's Philosophie de la photographie of 1983; Lemagny's La Photographie Créative, 1984; Gaston Fernandez Carrera's, La Photographie, le néant, 1986; Jean-Marie Schaeffer's L'Image Précaire, 1987; and American art critic Rosalind Krauss's Le Photographique: pour une théorie des écarts published directly in French (there was no American edition) in 1990, ten years after Roland Barthes' seminal book, Camera Lucida.

An editorial desire was to promote another type of photography freed from the aesthetic and informative requirements of the image alone, identified by Alain Bergala as a break with the French tradition of "the beautiful image"; an aesthetic of the banal everyday image as an "amplifier of existence" that exposes the fictitious and self-documentary power of photography, for which the Cahiers de la photographie provides the critical apparatus; a place for a dialogue between text and photography around questions of identity and subjective writing.

== Founding ==
The founding of the journal arose from a meeting in a restaurant on rue Froidevaux in Paris by Claude Nori, Bernard Plossu, Gilles Mora, joined by Denis Roche and Jean-Claude Lemagny. The journal was thematic, particular examples being an issue on "L'Acte photographique" (1982), another on "L'OEuvre photographique" (1985), both being the proceedings of two important conferences that the magazine organised at the Sorbonne, with other issues devoted, one to Robert Frank, another to Denis Roche, etc. The first issue of Cahiers de la photographie came out in the first quarter of 1981, published with Contrejour editions.

Nominally trimestrial, it started with four issues in 1981 and 1983, and was sometimes interrupted; there were no editions published in 1987 or 1991; only two in 1984, 1988, and 1989; one in 1990; and only two in 1994, its final year.

== Contents ==
Les cahiers de la photographie drew on the writings of its founders and others who reflect on photography whether as a central or incidental concern, critics, historians, philosophers and artists from all countries; Anne Baldassari, Angelo Schwarz, Henri Van Lier, André Rouillé, Jean Arrouye, Olivier Revault d'Allonnes, Arnaud Claass, Philippe Dubois, Luigi Ghirri, Alain Fleig, Jacques Clayssen, Alain Desvergnes, Gabriel Bauret, Jean Kempf, Patrick Roegiers.

For ten years, through monthly meetings, internal debates, dissensions and thematic issues Cahiers de la photographie reviewed creative photography from examples drawn from the work of photographers, without neglecting the historical, social or aesthetic conditions of reception of their work.

In 1985, an historical issue devoted, for the first time, to the work of Robert Frank was conceived as a gesture of admiration for, and complicity with, this artist, but also to set forth the critical capacity of the artist.

In a special issue n.18 on Henri Cartier-Bresson diverse essays included one by Cartier-Bresson himself, L'instant décisif ('The Decisive Moment') followed by; Christian Phéline's "Meurtres dans un jardin français" ('Murders in a French Garden'), Jean Kempf "A propos d'Henri Cartier-Bresson"; Jean-Claude Lemagny: "Le dessin d'Henri Cartier-Bresson" ('drawing by Henri Cartier-Bresson'); Julien Levy: "Henri Cartier-Bresson"; Gilles Mora: "Le grand jeu" (The Great Game'); Anne Baldassari's interview with Pierre de Fenoyl; Eric Bullot: "Esthétique du discontinu" ('Discontinuous aesthetics'); Patrick Roegiers: "Mais où est passé le chat de Steinberg?" ('But where did Steinberg's cat go?'); Jean Arrouye: "Le temps d'une photographie" (Time in a photograph); Gabriel Bauret: "Parcours d'une bibliographie" ('Browsing a bibliography'); Micheline Lo: "Suite espagnole n°9; Ernst Haas: "HBC, une vision lyrique du monde" ('HBC, a lyrical vision of the world'); Henri Cartier-Bresson and Gilles Mora: Conversation; and concluding with a letter to Cahiers de la Photographie from Cartier-Bresson.

Published issues
Number	Year	Content
1	1981	Critical approaches to the photographic act
2	1981	Photography and literature
3	1981	What history of photography?
4	1981	The body observed
5	1982	On style
6	1982	Photographic spaces: the book
7	1982	Photographic spaces, the gallery
8	1983	The photographic act
9	1983	Humanist photographers: Doisneau, Boubat, Izis et al.
10	1983	Contacts
11/12	1983	Robert Frank: photography, finally!
13	1984	Photobiography
14	1984	Territory
15	1985	Report on the Sorbonne colloquium on photographic work
16	1985	The Zone System: introduction to a photographic method / ed. Pierre-Eric Baïda, Patrick Bertholdy, Michel Cégretin (co-edition Laplume)
17	1985	The accusing image
18	1986	Henri Cartier-Bresson
19	1986	Frames / formats
20	1986	Arnaud Claas
21	1988	Patrick Roegiers, The living eye
22	1988	Ralph Gibson
23	1989	Denis Roche
24	1989	20 years of creative photography in France 68/88
25	1990	Roland Barthes and the photo: The worst signs
26	1992	Jean-Claude Bélégou, Faces, and The Lovers
27	1992	Photographic history of photography, Henri Van Lier
28	1992	The European breakaway: Through the collection of the Maison Européenne de la Photographie
29	1994	Jean-Claude Bélégou, Wandering in the far North
30	1994	Charles Camberoque : Photographs, 1975 - 1993

== Cessation ==
Symptomatic of a dissolution of interest in photography as a unitary medium in favour of postmodern plurality, and the rise of new and digital media, it was decided to cease after ten years, in 1990.

== Resumption ==
The title Les cahiers de la photographie was resumed for an unrelated publication starting July/September 2010 which is the magazine of l'Union des Photographes Professionnels, and revamped in 2017. It had run to issue 15 in January 2020.
