= Gilles Mora =

Gilles Mora (born 1945) is a French photography historian and critic specialising in 20th century American photography, and photographer. He has edited books on Walker Evans, Edward Weston, W. Eugene Smith, Aaron Siskind and William Gedney, as well as published a book of his own photographs, Antebellum. Mora won the Prix Nadar in 2007 for the book La Photographie Américaine: 1958–1981: the Last Photographic Heroes.

Mora launched the FRAC regional contemporary art fund in Bordeaux and oversaw photography at Éditions du Seuil. He was artistic director of Rencontres d'Arles and is currently exhibition curator at a museum in Montpellier, where he lives. He was co-founder of the magazine Les Cahiers de la photographie and founder of the journal L'Œuvre Photographique; both of which he was editor-in-chief of.

== Life and work ==
Mora was born in Vélines, Dordogne, southwestern France.

He was for a time professor at the Ecole Normale D'agen in Agen, southwestern France. In 1981, with Claude Nori, Bernard Plossu, Denis Roche and Jean-Claude Lemagny, he created the magazine Les Cahiers de la photographie. He was its editor-in-chief until 1993. In 1985, Mora launched the Fonds régional d'art contemporain (FRAC, regional contemporary art fund) in Bordeaux. In 1991, he was appointed collection director, overseeing the photography program for the publisher Éditions du Seuil, where he remained until 2007. In 1993, Mora founded and was editor-in-chief of L'Œuvre Photographique, a journal of photography. He was artistic director of the Rencontres d'Arles photography festival from 1999 to 2001. Since 2010 he has been exhibition curator of the People's Pavilion (Pavillon Populaire) photography museum in Montpellier, where he lives.

Mora's book of his own photographs, Antebellum, was published in 2016. It contains photographs of the Southeastern United States made over more than twenty years—Mora and his wife left France in 1972 to teach French language in public schools in Louisiana. The work evokes the disappearing world of the Deep South, its title being a reference to Antebellum South.

== Personal life ==
Mora is married to Françoise, whom he met in high school.

He is a lead singer and guitarist in the rock group Frantic Rollers.

== Publications ==
=== Publications of photographs by Mora ===
- Antebellum. Marcillac-Vallon, France: Lamaindonne; Austin: University of Texas Press, 2016. ISBN 978-1-4773-1184-4.

=== Publications edited or co-edited by Mora ===
- Walker Evans: Havana 1933. London: Thames & Hudson, 1989. ISBN 978-0500541579.
- Edward Weston: Forms of Passion, Passion of Forms. 1995. ISBN 0-8109-3979-7.
- W. Eugene Smith: Photographs 1934–1975. New York: Harry N. Abrams, 1998. Edited by Mora and John T. Hill. ISBN 978-0810941915. With essays by Gabriel Bauret, Hill, Mora, Serge Tisseron, and Alan Trachtenberg.
  - W. Eugene Smith: the Camera as Conscience. London: Thames & Hudson, 1998. ISBN 978-0500542255.
- PhotoSpeak: a Guide to the Ideas, Movements, and Techniques of Photography, 1839 to the Present. New York: Abbeville, 1997. ISBN 978-0789200686
- Walker Evans: the Hungry Eye. New York: Harry N. Abrams, 2004. ISBN 978-0810991873.
- FSA: the American Vision. New York: Harry N. Abrams, 2006. ISBN 978-0810954977
- La Photographie Américaine: 1958–1981: the Last Photographic Heroes. Paris: Éditions du Seuil, 2007. On Robert Frank, William Gedney, Don Donaghy, Harry Callahan, Aaron Siskind, Danny Lyon, Lee Friedlander, Garry Winogrand, Tod Papageorge, Charles Harbutt, Charles H. Traub, Emmet Gowin, Ralph Eugene Meatyard, Les Krims, Duane Michals, Arthur Tress, Robert Heinecken, John Pfahl, David Levinthal, John Szarkowski, Mike Mandel, Ralph Gibson, Bill Owens, Nicholas Nixon, Robert Adams, Henry Wessel Jr., Lewis Baltz, Joe Deal, William Eggleston, William Christenberry, Stephen Shore, and Joel Meyerowitz.
  - The Last Photographic Heroes: American photographers of the Sixties and Seventies. 2007. ISBN 9780810993747. Translated from the French by Nicholas Elliott.
- Aaron Siskind: Another Photographic Reality. Austin: University of Texas Press, 2014. ISBN 978-0292762916.
- William Gedney: Only the Lonely, 1955–1984. Austin: University of Texas Press, 2017. Edited by Mora, Margaret Sartor and Lisa McCart. ISBN 978-1-4773-1483-8.

== Awards ==
- 2007: Prix Nadar, for La Photographie Américaine: 1958–1981: the Last Photographic Heroes
