= Serge Tisseron =

French psychiatrist and psychologist

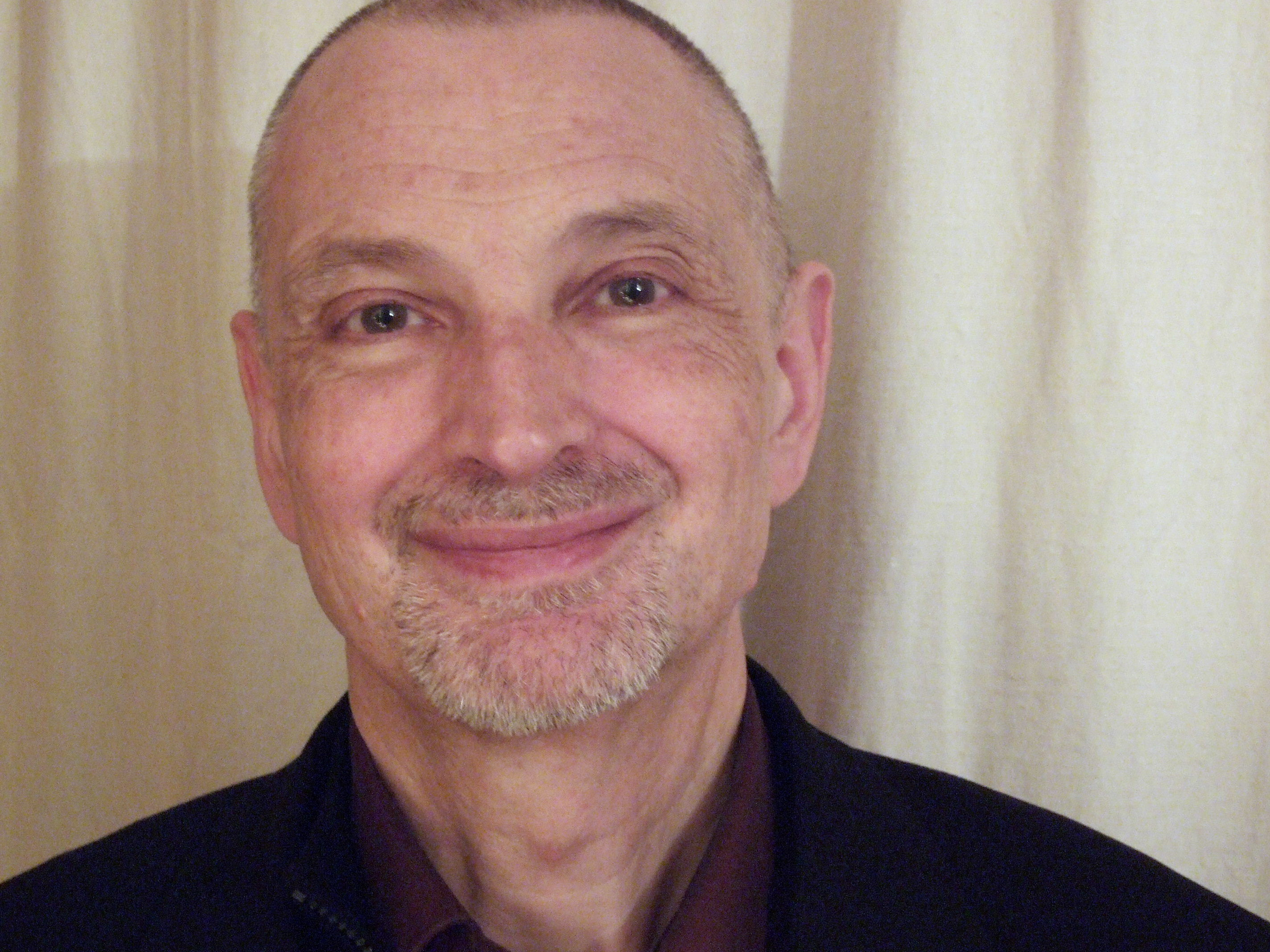
- Born: 8 March 1948 (age 78); Valence, France

Philosophical work
- School: Surrealism
- Main interests: Relationship with images and new technologies Family secrets Photography
- Notable ideas: Extimacy

Serge Tisseron (born 8 March 1948 in Valence, France) is a French psychoanalyst and psychiatrist. He holds a PhD in Psychology. He is a senior research fellow at University Paris VII Denis Diderot. He is a member of Centre of Psychoanalysis Research, Medicine and Society at Université Paris VII (CRPMS). He studies the relationships between youth, the media and images and the effect of information and communication technology on young people. He is also an illustrator and a photographer.

He has written approximately forty books, including instructive works for parents, that were translated into several languages. His simple and precise writing style helped his books to reach best-seller status. In 2001, he was awarded the Prix du livre de Télévision. In 2002, the Academy of Moral and Political Sciences awarded him its Stassart prize, Professor Serge Tisseron was recently awarded in Paris the Nafsaniyoun Award given by the Lebanese center of psychological and social sciences known as Nafsaniyoun for his life achievements especially his researches on new technology and its effects.

== Early life ==
As a teenager, Tisseron focused his education on literary studies. He began by following Hypokhâgne at Lycée Du Parc to prepare for Normale Sup'. He developed an interest in surrealism, which led him to become more interested in psychological deviances, mental illness and insanity.

Tisseron did not feel at ease studying psychiatry, as he felt that the other students were too arrogant. During his second year, he switched to psychology and moved to Paris to write his medical thesis. Tisseron practiced medicine in a hospital from 1978 to 1997, founding its mobile palliative care unit in 1990. After this time he taught psychology at University of Paris.

== Thesis ==
Tisseron delivered his thesis in the form of a comic strip, denouncing what he considered to be that era's "medical sadism". He defended his thesis at Claude Bernard University in Lyon, in 1975. The 48-page work is titled Contribution à l'introduction de la bande dessinée dans la pédagogie universitaire. Une tentative sur l'histoire de la psychiatrie. The work was dedicated to the history of psychiatry and was inspired by three different sources : "L’histoire de la folie" (Madness and Civilization) by Michel Foucault; the works of Thomas Szasz; and his own research at the library of Saint-Anne's hospital. Another aim of his thesis was to demonstrate that images are part of the world's symbolism as much as written and spoken languages.

== Projects ==
On October 18, 2007, he launched a petition to prohibit children under three years old from watching television. This resulted in new restrictions on broadcasts aimed at babies and toddlers. In November 2008, the French Ministry of Health mandated that all such programs must display a warning.

Between 2005 and 2008, he developed an activity aiming to improve children's empathic skills in kindergarten. He called it the "Three Figures game", in reference to the three characters featuring in most children's games and scenarios: the perpetrator, the victim and the vindicator. "Three Figures", practiced by teachers themselves after a three-day training, represents five of the six goals in kindergarten: appropriating language, learning the rules of living together, acting and body language, developing imagination and preparing to write. It is also a form of pre-education in imagery and training in how to pretend. At the same time, it aims to reduce violence by increasing the capacity for empathy. Tisseron was charged by several academies to educate trainers on the technique.

In 2008, he developed the "3-6-9-12" rule, referring to no screen time before three years old, no game console before six years old, no accompanied Internet before nine years old, no solo Internet before eleven years old, and no social media before twelve. Since 2011, the rule has been publicized by the Association Française Pédiatrie Ambulatoire (AFPA). According to Tisseron, he began the "3-6-9-12" campaign in order to generate a public debate around screens. In his view, children have to learn proper use of such tools. Tisseron suggested that we think about introducing digital spaces into therapy. The Internet represents a new way of transmitting information by way of horizontal communication. According to Tisseron, children benefit from sharing screens more than from using them individually. He claimed that new technologies feed the collective intelligence.

Also in 2008, he founded the Institute of the History and Memory of Disasters (IHMEC). Its objective is to contribute to a memory and a "culture" of risk through the establishment of a bank of evidence to support the resilience of present and future generations.

== Membership of scientific societies ==
- Editorial Board of Psychiatrie Française
- Editorial Board of Cahiers de Médiologie
- Scientific Committee of Journal de votre enfant
- Parent-Child Scientist council Espace Parent-Enfant (Issy les Moulineaux)
- Board of the French Society of Psychoanalytic Family Therapy
- Advisory Council of Families and Early Childhood of the City of Paris
- Former President of the Society of Family Therapy Psychoanalytic in Ile de France (Currently mediator in that company)

== Research topics ==
His main research focuses on family secrets, relationships with images and new technologies.

=== Family secrets ===
Serge Tisseron is interested in family secrets. He claims that revealing such secrets can cause injury. He advises asking good questions, avoid demanding answers, developing an interest in family history and to recall how elders responded to earlier questions.

Tisseron deduced that The Adventures of Tintin, a comic series created by the Belgian cartoonist Hergé reflected the previously undisclosed fact that the author's father's own father was unknown, a fact later confirmed by journalists.

=== Images and media ===
He investigated relationships with cartoons and photography.

==== Photography ====
In 2008, Tisseron published an updated version of "Camera Lucida" by Roland Barthes, "Les mystères de la chambre claire". In this book, Tisseron questioned the commonplace of photography and adds the concept of digital picture. He analyzes the relationship between a man and a picture from a psychological point of view. Tisseron said, opposing Barthes: The picture isn't only a nostalgia from the past, a picture is the result of two different moves : stopping time for the representation and following the motion of the world.

==== Comic strips and drawings ====
Tisseron became interested in subculture and used his passion for drawing to create several militant comic strips. His medical PhD was a comic strip that recalls the history of psychiatry. He continues to draw for specialist magazines such as Psychologies Magazine. He suggested a parallel between the different steps in writing and drawing. He explains that a young child's first drawings are guided by visual exploration of movements, sensations and not by visual perception. Such explorations have a physical and a psychological value.

=== New technologies and child development ===
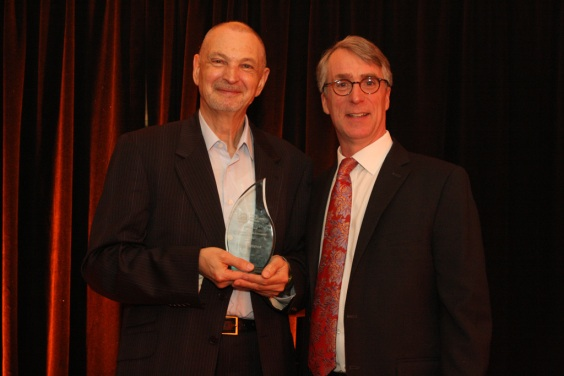
Serge Tisseron receiving his Award from Stephen Balkam (CEO of FOSI).

In his book Virtuel, mon amour, Tisseron talks about the misunderstanding between adults and the next generation. He explains teenagers express their anxiety has changed to include chat, video games and other new technologies and that parents are often unable to process these new expressions.

In 2013, he promoted a web site with the General Secretariat of Catholic Education to explain parents and children how to "tame" screens. It highlights his "3-6-9-12" rule.

==== Screens ====
Tisseron says that home screens can dangerously isolate users. He worked on a project called «Dizaine pour apprivoiser les écrans» that was inspired by the Student Media Awareness to Reduce Television program in 1996-1997 by Robinson's team in California. It attempted to increase children's awareness and control over their screen time. It proposed that over ten days or a week, kids be invited to choose their favorite TV programs and video games and give up all others. Meanwhile, parents and instructors organize and lead other activities including focusing on photography and world building to encourage them to develop their own imagination.

==== Identity ====
Teenagers may use the Internet to explore alternate identities, hiding their appearance from those they encounter. Conversely others, including predators, may conceal their own identities in order to engage with those who fail to recognize the deception. Internet relationships are not typically managed according to traditional social conventions that protected (and limited the choices of) young people who had not developed strong defense mechanisms to protect themselves. The intermittent and deliberate nature of digital interactions give participants greater control over the pace and timing of their relationships. The absence of physical contact limits the kinds of harm that participants can experience. Digital interactions can broaden the range of people that young people can reach, creating the potential for those unable to find community within the "real world" to do so within the larger online world.

==== Video games ====
Tusseron draws lessons for education from the success of Video games. Self-pacing, the chance to repeat an unsuccessful lesson or test, experiments with various learning strategies, point systems, levels and anonymity can all inform online education development.

Potential negative effects, particularly when the player focuses completely on sensory and motor interactions, potentially leading to addiction.

==== Advice for parents ====
Tussore advises that parents should frequently speak with their children, including about their digital experiences and be aware of their activities.

He reminds that the portrayal of violence is also present in traditional media. Children may play games to find a less stressful experience than they find in the real world rather than gaming just for the thrills the games offer.

=== Extimacy ===
Historically, extimacy named the concept that no useful distinction separated the psyche from the external world. Tissoren used a separate meaning, to describe the repositioning of elements of private lives into public view to produce feedback. It differs from both exhibitionism and conformism in that it is an attempt to develop the self and the concordant self-esteem rather than simply position the exhibitor with respect to others. Extimacy is then the desire to reveal some aspects of the inner self.

=== Symbolism ===
He elaborated three major concepts coined by Freud and Ferenczi: projection, introjection, internalization. They noticed that patients could project their fantasies on other subjects, introject good objects or internalise intersubjective relationships. This remark provided the theoretical grounds for psychoanalysis. Tisseron said that all stress is mediated by the seven senses (including proprioception and vestibular perception) coupled with non- and verbal communication.

Tussore defined sympolization as the process by which a subject internalizes experiences of the outside world. For this purpose, three media are used: sensory-motor skills, images and words.

==== Sensory-motor skills ====
For example, a woman is followed by three girls. The woman walks quickly and stumbles. She gesticulates and manages to retrieve her balance. She turns and curses the sidewalk. The three girls had a strong reaction and became afraid. These last three react against the event. They all tap on the sidewalk in imitation. They accepted the event and introduced it into their psyches. They connected the perception with the emotion and the motricity. It demonstrates that every situation can be contextualized.

==== Image ====
Tisseron explains that images are not real, but that the emotions they trigger are. Culture, including that of individual families, directs such emotions. He assigned responsibility for such direction to parents.

A second developmental role for images is early childhood drawings that usually begin with lines going away from the child's body.

=== Empathy ===
Tisseron advocates that psychoanalysts employ empathy as the primary analytic relationship to patients. He claimed that the objectivity sought by earlier generations worsened patient discomfort without advancing therapeutic goals.

=== Resilience ===
Tisseron uses resilience as a psychological concept. It is the ability of a patient or a community to withstand or rebuild following trauma. He does not define the term, claiming that its scientific usage is limiting and concludes that is a complex process never completed.

== Recognition ==
On 6 November 2013 Serge Tisseron received an "Award for outstanding Achievement" from the FOSI (Family Online Safety Institute) for his work on teenagers and internet, and especially for the "3-6-9-12" campaign he launched.

== Bibliography ==
=== Recent books ===
- (2013) Fragments d’une psychanalyse emphatique. Paris: Albin Michel.
- (2012) Rêver, fantasmer, virtualiser, du virtuel psychique au virtuel numérique. Paris : Dunod.
- (2013) 3- 6- 9-12 : Apprivoiser les écrans et grandir.
- (2011) Les secrets de famille., Paris : PUF.
- (2011) Ces désirs qui nous font honte. Désirer, souhaiter, agir : le risque de la confusion. Ed Fabert.
- (2011) Vérités et mensonges de nos émotions. Paris: Albin Michel.

=== Recent contribution to collective works ===
- (2013) Attrape-moi si tu peux., La médiation des mondes numériques en thérapie d’adolescents, Cahn R., Gutton P., Robert P., Tisseron S., L’ado et son psy. Nouvelles approaches thérapeutiques en psychanalyse, Paris.
- (2013) L’adolescente et le cinéma., Préface à Dupont S., Paris H., (dir). La vie de l’enfant, De Lolita à Twilight. Paris, Ed. Erès
- (2013) L’enfant et les écrans, un avis de l’Académie des Sciences. Bach, J. F., Houde, O, Lena, P. Paris, Le Pommier.
- (2013) Subjectivation et empathie dans les mondes numériques. (Tisseron, Virole, B., Givre, Ph., et al.).

=== Comics and illustrated books ===
- (1978) « Histoire de la psychiatrie en bandes dessinées ». Paris, Savelli, 1978.
- (1994) « Les Oreilles sales ». Paris, Les empêcheurs de penser en rond, 1994.
- (2004) « Journal d’un psychanalyste (2003) ». Paris, Marabout poche, 2004
- (2004) « La télé en famille, Oui ! ». Paris, Bayard, 2004.
- (2004) « Tintouin chez le psychanalyste ». Paris, Calmann-Lévy, 2004.
- (2005) « Bulles de divan (2001) ». Paris, Marabout poche, 2005.
- (2005) « Dessous de divan ». Paris, Calmann-Lévy, 2005.
- (2006) « Le Petit livre pour bien vivre les secrets en famille ». Paris, Bayard, 2006.
- (2008) « Le Mystère des graines à bébé ». Paris, Albin Michel jeunesse, 2008.

=== Examples of publications about photography ===
- (2010) Quand le numérique révèle la photographie à elle-même . Colloque sur Le tableau vivant - 18 mars 2010.
- (2010) Tout est flou, faites des photos nettes !". Les Cahiers de la photographie N° 2, Image et Pouvoirs, 2010.
- (2011) Filmer avec la main". Festival Caméras mobiles, lux Scène nationale de Valence, 2011.

=== Books with photographers ===
- (1994) Nuages/Soleil, photographies de Bernard Plossu. Paris, Marval. Published in 1994.
- (1995) D’air en air, photographies de Catherine Noury. Paris, Filigranes. published in 1995.
- (1999) Toi et moi, photographies de Claude Nori. Paris, En Vues. Published in 1999.
- (1999) W. Eugène Smith, Du côté de l’ombre. Paris, Le seuil. Published in 1999.
- (2001) Contemplating Touch, In Human Touch, Photographs by Ernestine Ruben .Portland, Nazraeli Press. Published in 2001.
- (2012) Vis-à-vies, Photographies de Thomas Bilanges. Marseille, Le bec en l’air. Published in 2012.

=== Examples of articles ===
- (2012). Intervieuw d'Elie Rotenberg, "Clinique du virtuel: rêvasser, rêver ou imaginer", Adolescence 2012/1, n° 79, p. 63-87 & 145-157.
- (2012). Le danger de la fracture d'usage, Les Cahiers Dynamiques, févvrier, n° 55, p. 49-55.
- (2012). Rêveries et rêvasseries assistées par ordinateur, Enfances & Psy, n° 55, p. 105-115.
- (2013). Virtuel psychique et virtuel numérique. Sciences humaines, octobre, n° 25.
- (2013). Résiliences : ambiguïtés et espoirs, Responsabilité et environnement, n° 72, p. 17-21

=== Conference attendance ===
Tisseron presented at many conferences across the world on topics such as children development, family and culture, consumerism, democracy and new technologies, such as web dependency.
