= William Gedney (disambiguation) =

William Gedney was a photographer.

William Gedney may also refer to:

- William J. Gedney
- William Gedney (MP) for Wells (UK Parliament constituency)
