= Me and My Brother (film) =

- Directed by: Robert Frank
- Written by: Robert Frank; Allen Ginsberg; Peter Orlovsky; Sam Shepard
- Produced by: Helen Silverstein
- Starring: Julius Orlovsky; Peter Orlovsky
- Cinematography: Robert Frank
- Edited by: Bob Easton; Helen Silverstein
- Release date: February 2, 1969
- Running time: 91 minutes
- Country: United States
- Language: English

Me and My Brother is a 1969 independent film directed by Robert Frank. The film stars Julius Orlovsky, Peter Orlovsky, John Coe, Seth Allen and Christopher Walken in his feature film debut. It is Sam Shepard's film debut. The film tells the story of Peter and Julius Orlovsky.

== Plot ==
The "Me" and "My Brother" of the title are interchangeably Peter Orlovsky (a poet, and protégé and long-term lover of Allen Ginsberg), and his schizophrenic brother Julius. Peter arranges for Julius' release from Bellevue Hospital and proceeds to drag him all over the Beat landscape with a film crew in tow.

Robert Frank does yeoman work following the manic Peter and catatonic Julius from one situation to another until Julius wanders off camera and out of the picture. At this point Joseph Chaikin takes Julius' place and fills in for a time. The overall effect is fascinating, and the film has a great deal to say about what we consider normal and acceptable behaviour vs. what we consider "mad" behaviour.

== See also ==
- List of American films of 1969
