= Peter Orlovsky =

American poet and actor (1933–2010)

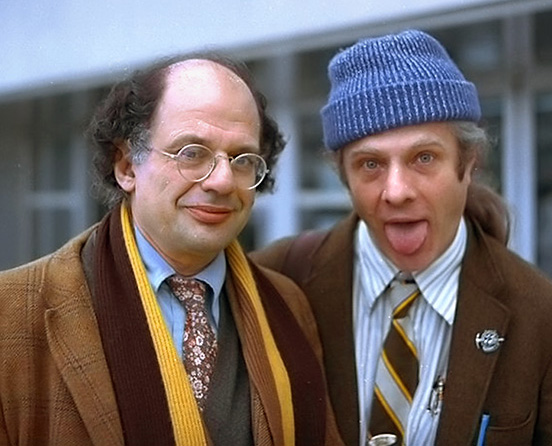
- Orlovsky (right) with Allen Ginsberg, 1978
- Born: Peter Anton Orlovsky; July 8, 1933; New York City, New York, U.S.
- Died: May 30, 2010 (aged 76); Williston, Vermont, U.S.
- Resting place: Shambhala Mountain Center, Red Feather Lakes, Colorado, U.S.
- Education: Columbia University
- Years active: 1953–2008
- Partner: Allen Ginsberg (1954-1997; Ginsberg's death)

Peter Anton Orlovsky (July 8, 1933 – May 30, 2010) was an American poet and actor. He was the long-time partner of Allen Ginsberg.

== Early life and career ==
Orlovsky was born on the Lower East Side of Manhattan in New York City, the son of Katherine (née Schwarten) and Oleg Orlovsky, a Russian immigrant. He was raised in poverty and was forced to drop out of Newtown High School in his senior year so he could support his impoverished family. After many odd jobs, he began working as an orderly at Creedmoor State Mental Hospital, known today as Creedmoor Psychiatric Center.

In 1953, Orlovsky was drafted into the United States Army for the Korean War at nineteen years old. Army psychiatrists ordered his transfer off the front to work as a medic in a San Francisco hospital. He later went to Columbia University.

He met Allen Ginsberg while working as a model for the painter Robert La Vigne in San Francisco in December 1954. Prior to meeting Ginsberg, Orlovsky had made no deliberate attempts at becoming a poet. Ginsberg was living with his girlfriend Sheila Williams Boucher at the time, but broke off the relationship to be with Orlovsky. Orlovsky also had a sexual relationship with Boucher during this time. Ginsberg and Orlovsky considered their relationship to be a "marriage sealed by vows." It was an open relationship, in part because Orlovsky was bisexual. Orlovsky was Ginsberg's lover and partner until Ginsberg's death in 1997.

In 1954, Orlovsky was the subject of the painting "Nude With Onions (Peter Orlovsky)" by painter Robert LaVigne.

With Ginsberg's encouragement, Orlovsky began writing in 1957 while the pair were living in Paris. Accompanied by other beat writers, Orlovsky traveled extensively for several years throughout the Middle East, Northern Africa, India, and Europe. He also helped produce and contributed vocals to Ginsberg's 1970 LP Songs of Innocence and Experience, based on William Blake's poetry collection of the same name.

In 1974, Orlovsky joined the faculty of the Jack Kerouac School of Disembodied Poetics at the Naropa Institute in Boulder, Colorado, teaching poetry. In 1979, he received a $10,000 grant from the National Endowment for the Arts to continue his creative endeavors.

== Death ==
In May 2010, friends reported that Orlovsky, who had had lung cancer for several months, was moved from his home in St. Johnsbury, Vermont, to the Vermont Respite House in Williston. He died there on May 30, 2010, from complications of the disease; he was 76 years old. He is buried at Shambhala Mountain Center in Red Feather Lakes, Colorado. His epitaph reads: "Train will tug my grave, my breath hueing gentil vapor between weel & track".

== Poetry ==
- Dear Allen, Ship will land January 23, 58 (1971)
- Lepers Cry (1972)
- Clean Asshole Poems & Smiling Vegetable Songs (1978) (reprinted 1992)
- Straight Hearts' Delight: Love Poems and Selected Letters (with Allen Ginsberg) (1980)
- Dick Tracy's Gelber Hut und andere Gedichte (German translation) (1984)
- Sauber abgewischt (German translation by Marcus Roloff) (2020)

His work has also appeared in The New American Poetry 1945–1960 (1960), The Beatitude Anthology (1965), as well as the literary magazines Yugen and Outsider.

== Films ==
Orlovsky appeared in at least six films: Andy Warhol's Couch (1965), Conrad Rooks's Chappaqua (1966), Stan Brakhage's Thot-Fal'N (1978), and three by Robert Frank. Alongside Ginsberg, he acted in Pull My Daisy (co-directed by Alfred Leslie, 1959), a landmark Beat film written and narrated by Kerouac. In Me and My Brother (1969), he appears with his brother Julius, who had been discharged from Bellevue Hospital after treatment for schizophrenia. Orlovsky plays a prominent role in C'est Vrai! (One Hour) an hour-long, one-take video Frank made for French television in 1990.

== Filmography ==
- Pull My Daisy (1959)
- Couch (1964)
- Chappaqua (1966)
- Me and My Brother (1969)
- Thot-Fal'N (1978)
- C'est Vrai! (One Hour) (1990)
