= Jean-Maurice Rouquette =

French historian (1930–2019)

- Born: 1930; Arles, France
- Died: 22 January 2019 (aged 88–89); Arles, France
- Occupation: Historian

Jean-Maurice Rouquette (1930 – 22 January 2019) was a French historian, specializing in ancient and Romanesque Provence, and curator at the Musée de l'Arles et de la Provence antiques.

== Biography ==
Rouquette studied at Aix-Marseille University, where he was a student under Georges Duby and Jean-Rémy Palanque. He was particularly interested in paleochristian and Romanesque Provence studies. He was the curator of Musées et Monuments d’Arles from 1956 to 1996. Rouquette served as president of the Museon Arlaten Autonomous Committee, president of the Académie d'Arles, and designer and chief curator of Musée de l'Arles et de la Provence antiques. He also co-founded the Rencontres d'Arles and the Parc naturel régional de Camargue. Rouquette was a member of the Conseil économique, social et environnemental régional - Provence-Alpes-Côte d'Azur (CESER) and was on the Tourism Committee.

== Works ==
- Trois nouveaux sarcophages chrétiens à Trinquetaille (1974)
- Itinéraires romans en Provence (1978)
- Provence Romane (1982)
- Arles antique, monuments et sites (1989)
- Arles antique (1990)
- L’Abbaye de Montmajour (1999)
- Promenades en Provence Romane (2002)
- Arles, histoire, territoires et cultures. (2008)
- Le théâtre antique d'Arles (2010)
