= Rogi André =

Hungarian-born French photographer and painter

Rogi André, 1930, self-Portrait

Rogi André (10 August 1900 – 11 April 1970) was a Hungarian-born French photographer and artist. She was known for her portraits of prominent artists and intellectuals in early 20th-century Paris. Born Rozsa Klein, she adopted the name Rogi André and became recognized for her distinctive approach to portrait photography, often capturing her subjects in natural, intimate settings. She was associated with the avant-garde artistic circles of the time and photographed notable figures such as Henri Matisse, André Derain, and Jean Cocteau. André was also briefly married to the surrealist photographer André Kertész, though she developed her own artistic identity independent of his influence.

In 1928, André produced her first nude photos and in 1936, some were published in Arts et Métiers Graphiques. By 1941 André had prospered, but because of World War II, she was forced to flee in the free zone and take refuge in Touraine because of her Jewish origins. After the war, André resumed painting, though meanwhile showed in an international group exhibition of portrait photography in the Galeries Mazarine et Mansart of the Bibliothèque nationale,

== Early life ==
Rozsa Klein was born on 10 August 1900 in Budapest, the daughter of a doctor. She suffered severe curvature of the spine that limited her movements due to the steel corset her father prescribed for her. He encouraged her to study art and violin and she became accomplished in both, graduating from the Budapest School of Fine Arts.

== Early career ==
Attracted to the bohemian milieu of Paris like other Hungarians including Brassai and André Kertesz, André settled there in 1925 amongst exiled supporters of Count Mihály Károlyi, temporary president of the Hungarian Republic, all opposed to the dictatorial Horthy regime. They included the sculptor István Beöthy and his wife, the painter Anna Beöthy-Steiner (1902–1985). On 2 October 1928, she married Kertész who was her neighbour in the Montmartre Hôtel de la terrasses. Kertesz who had just purchased his first Leica and was getting commissions from the prestigious Vu magazine, with credits on several covers.

She and Kertesz lived together at 75 Boulevard du Montparnasse next to the constructivist gallery/bookshop L’esthétique founded by their friend, the painter Evsa Model, husband of Lisette Model. Like Brassai, who also knew them, she was influenced in her photography by Kertesz, but like Brassai she nevertheless eschewed the 35mm camera for a Voigtlander Bergheil 9×12 folding camera that took glass plates (which by the 1920s were quite outmoded).

== Independence ==
In 1928, André produced her first nude photos and in 1936 some were published in Arts et Métiers Graphiques to which she had contributed from 1932, as well as to Paris Magazine and Verve, when she moved into a building on the Rue du Père-Cotentin to partner with two other photographers, Florence Henri and Ilse Bing. The move was the result of her divorce from Kertész that year; after he abandoned her for his mistress (who would become his second wife) Élisabeth Sali. From his first name, and out of continued affection for him, she created a male alias 'Rogi André'. On meeting Lisette Model she gave her the advice her husband had given her: “Never photograph something you for which you have little enthusiasm, but only what interests you passionately."

She befriended the French and immigrant Surrealists including their leader André Breton for whom in 1934 she photographed Jacqueline Lamba‘s performances at Le Coliseum cinema and dance hall at 65 Rue de Rochechouart where several times a week she could be seen swimming naked. One was published to accompany Breton's text in Minotaure in 1935 and subsequently reproduced in his L’Amour Fou.

== Portraitist ==
André produced a pantheon of portraits of the personalities in the arts of Paris, starting in the 1930s, (several held in the collection of the Museum of Modern Art, New York). They include Pablo Picasso, Aristide Maillol, Wassily Kandinsky (she also photographed him lying in state), Fernand Léger, Florent Fels, Balthus, Le Corbusier, René Crevel, Ambroise Vollard, Antonin Artaud, Colette, André Breton, Jacques Prévert, François Mauriac, Pierre Roy, Maria Elena Vieira da Silva, Oscar Dominguez, Julio Gonzales, Maurice Utrillo, Max Ernst, Henri Matisse, Peggy Guggenheim, Jean Lurçat, Chaim Soutine, Pierre Descaves, Roland Penrose, Jacques Lipchitz, Jean Cocteau, Georges Rouault, Marc Chagall, Maurice de Vlaminck, Luis Buñuel, André Gide, Pierre Reverdy, Jacques Villon, Raoul Dufy, Max Jacob, Alberto Giacometti, Django Reinhardt, Jean Sablon, Marie Laurencin, Piet Mondrian, Nush Eluard, Marcel Duchamp, André Lhote, Pierre Loeb, Joan Miró, Pierre Bonnard, Florence Henri, Natalia Gontcharova, Georges Braque, and also André Derain, with prints of her 1939 portrait of him being held by MoMA and London's National Portrait Gallery. In 1937, she photographed Dora Maar.

By 1941 André had prospered, but because of World War II, she was forced to flee in the free zone and take refuge in Touraine because of her Jewish origins, but shortly after, she managed to hide in Paris, thanks to with the help of gallery owner Jeanne Bucher who hid her in her daughter's bedroom.

== Recognition ==
In 1935, the photographer and theoretician of photography Emmanuel Sougez, writing in the journal Arts et Métiers Graphique compared the photography of Rogi André and that of Laure Albin Guillot, and criticized the former for posing her subjects in their environment. Some critics have noted in her portraits an influence of Cubism, for example in the portrait of Dora Maar (c. 1940) in which she creates a geometric composition using the play of shadows and lights. Her pictures appeared in the annual Photo Graphie for 1935, 1936, 1937, 1938, and 1947.

In 1936, she presented four portraits in the international photography exhibition at the Pavillon de Marsan in Paris and in 1937, with others by Florence Henri and Man Ray, many were featured in an exhibition Origines et développement de l'art international indépendant at the Musée du Jeu de Paume, 30 July to 31 October 1937. They appeared also in the major exhibition Photography, 1839-1937 organised by Beaumont Newhall at the Museum of Modern Art in New York, Mar 17–Apr 18, 1937, and in MoMA's Portrait Photographs, Jul 9–Sep 28, 1969, and Portraits Nov 4–Dec 7, 1943. Her portraits were also published in Le Point : revue artistique et littéraire and other magazines at that time.

== Late career ==
From 1950, André resumed painting, though meanwhile showed in an international group exhibition of portrait photography in the Galeries Mazarine et Mansart of the Bibliothèque nationale, in 1961. In 1962, while living on restricted means, she attended the academy of painter André Lhote, while continuing to do photographic work on commission. A friend, Bernadette Dufort, generously helped her by developing her negatives for free and by making prints in her own darkroom.

On April 11, 1970, Rogi André died in Paris, in poverty and obscurity, and her modest possessions were put on sale at the Hôtel Drouot. Part of her archives, and in particular her prints, were however saved from destruction or loss thanks to the efforts of Jean-Claude Lemagny, curator responsible for contemporary photography at the Department of Prints and Photography, Bibliothèque nationale de France, who acquired them for the collection.

== Bibliography ==
- Rogi, André; Beslon, Renée (1981), Rogi André : portraits, Éditions du Regard

== Sources ==
- Brigitte Ollier, Élisabeth Nora, Frédéric Develay, Rogi André, photographe, éditions du Regard, 1999 (ISBN 978-2-84105-105-2)
