= Rencontres d'Arles =

International photo and art exhibition

Coordinates: 43°40′42″N 4°37′33″E

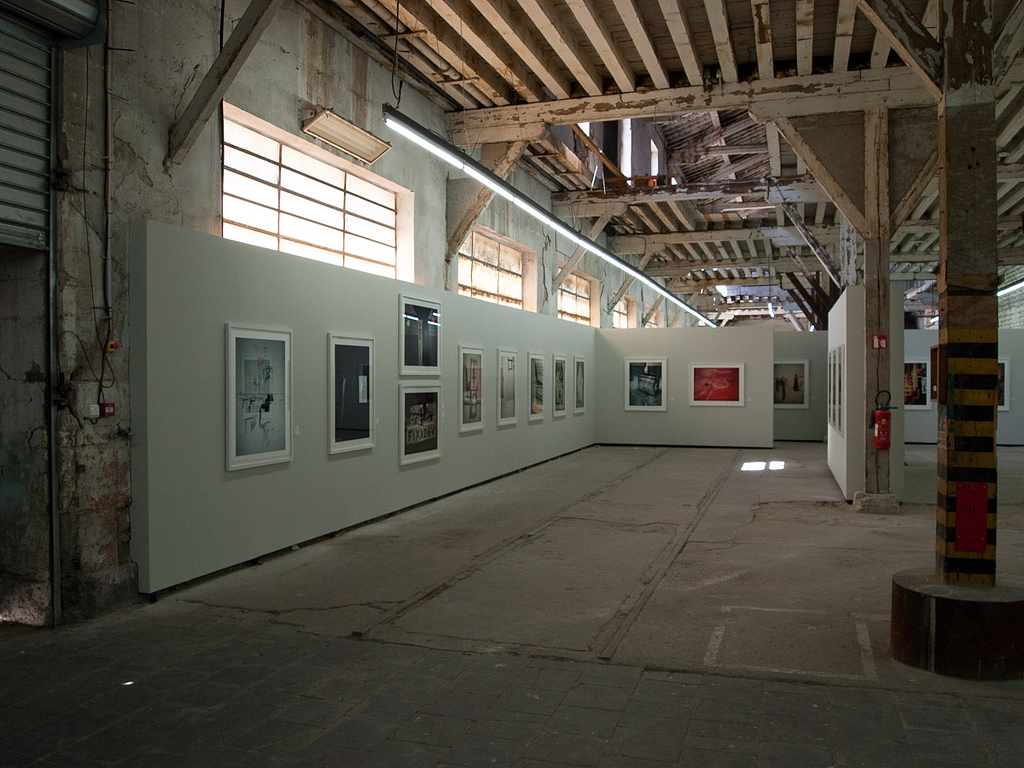
A photography exhibition, Rencontres d'Arles, 2010

The Rencontres d'Arles (formerly called Rencontres internationales de la photographie d'Arles) is an annual summer photography festival founded in provincial Arles in 1970 by the Arles photographer Lucien Clergue, the writer Michel Tournier and the historian Jean-Maurice Rouquette.

In 2015, the festival welcomed 93,000 visitors. In 2016, the 100,000 visitor mark was reached. In recent years the Rencontres d'Arles has invited many guest curators and entrusted some of its programming to figures such as Martin Parr in 2004, Raymond Depardon in 2006, the Arles-born fashion designer Christian Lacroix in 2008 and Nan Goldin in 2009.

== Exhibitions ==
Specially designed exhibitions, often organised in collaboration with French and foreign museums and institutions, take place in various historic sites. Some venues, such as 12th-century chapels or 19th-century industrial buildings, are open to the public throughout the festival.

The 51st edition of the festival was cancelled due to the COVID-19 pandemic, but the winners of the 2020 awards were nevertheless announced.

== Art directors ==
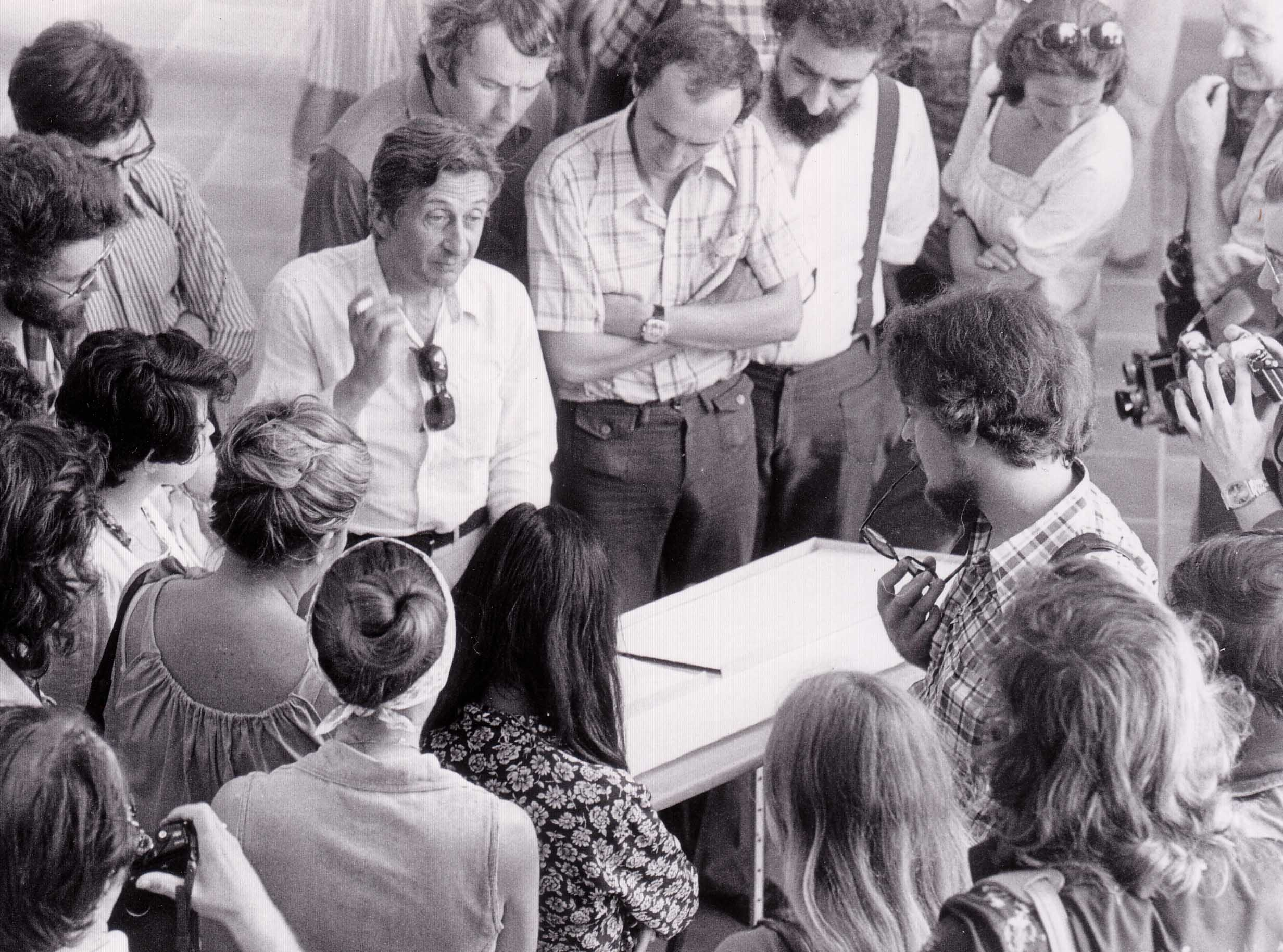
A photographer, Jean-Pierre Sudre, discussing his work, Rencontres d'Arles, 1975

- 1970 – 1972: Lucien Clergue, Michel Tournier, Jean-Maurice Rouquette
- 1973 – 1976: Lucien Clergue
- 1977: Bernard Perrine
- 1978: Jacques Manachem
- 1979 – 1982: Alain Desvergnes
- 1983 – 1985: Lucien Clergue
- 1986 – 1987: François Hébel
- 1988 – 1989: Claude Hudelot
- 1990: Agnès de Gouvion Saint-Cyr
- 1991 – 1993: Louis Mesplé
- 1994: Lucien Clergue
- 1995 – 1998, délégué général: Bernard Millet
  - 1995, artistic director: Michel Nuridsany
  - 1996, artistic director: Joan Fontcuberta
  - 1997, artistic director: Christian Caujolle
  - 1998, artistic director: Giovanna Calvenzi
- 1999 – 2001: Gilles Mora
- 2002 – 2014: François Hébel
- Since 2015: Sam Stourdzé

== Budget ==
Public funding accounted for 40 percent of the 2015 festival's €6.3 million budget, sales (mainly of tickets and derivative products), 40 percent and private partnerships, 20 percent.

=== Executive committee ===
- Hubert Védrine, president
- Hervé Schiavetti, vice-president
- Jean-François Dubos, vice-president
- Marin Karmitz, treasurer
- Françoise Nyssen, secretary
- Lucien Clergue, Jean-Maurice Rouquette, Michel Tournier, founding members

== See also ==
- Visa pour l'Image
