= Jean-Claude Lemagny =

French historian of photography (1931–2023)

Jean-Claude Lemagny (24 December 1931 – 19 January 2023) was a French library curator and historian of photography; a specialist in contemporary photography, he contributed to the world of fine-art photography in several roles.

== Early life and education ==
Born 24 December 1931 in Versailles, oldest of the three children of Paul Lemagny (a winner of the Prix de Rome) and Léonie Leloup, Jean-Claude Lemagny achieved a series of academic landmarks; a License in History and Geography, a Certificate in French Literature, a Certificate in Art of the Middle Ages, a Superior Studies Diploma in the History of Art, and an Aggregation in History, which is a prestigious professional qualification as a teacher.

== Bibliothèque nationale de France ==
Qualified as an art historian, librarian and curator, in 1963 he was employed at the Bibliothèque nationale de France, first cataloguing art books and eighteenth century French engravings. Also a professor at L'Ecole du Louvre, he taught classes on eighteenth century engraving.

== Curator of photography ==
In 1968, he was made responsible for the contemporary photography collection at the Bibliothèque nationale de France, a position he held until 1996. Influential in the recognition of photographic art by heritage institutions, he created 'La Galerie des photographies' in 1971 in the Library's Galerie Colbert. Highlighting contemporary photography and with a regular publication of catalogues he presented solo exhibitions of photographers including Édouard Boubat (1973), Gilles Caron (1978), Garry Winogrand (1980), Christian Milovanoff (1980), Rogi André (1981), François Le Diascorn (1982), Arnaud Claass (1982), Tom Drahos (1984), Charles Harbutt (1989), Bruce Gilden (1989), Louis Faurer (1990).

After the death in obscurity, on April 11, 1970, of the Hungarian-born French photographer Rogi André, briefly the first wife of André Kertész, Jean-Claude Lemagny rescued her archives from disaster, and in particular her original prints, which had been put on sale at the Hôtel Drouot, and acquired them for the National Library.

Lemagny also mounted exhibitions from the library's collection on a monthly basis so that it reflected the contemporary evolution of the medium. Over the years he served as photography curator the BNF acquired over 70,000 new photographs. Every ten years, exhibitions of acquisitions were presented, the first being organised in 1971. In total Lemagny presented more than two hundred exhibitions at the National Library and others in sites in Paris and around the world; Eloge de l'Ombre ('in Praise of the Shadow') for example, was presented to the public in 2000–2001 at the Kawasaki Municipal Museum and the Yamaguchi regional Fine Art Museum in Japan.

In 1981, he contributed to the creation of the journal Les Cahiers de la photographie, in which a number of his essays appeared.

In 1998, Lemagny retired as official curator of photography and was named an Honorary General Curator of the BNF.

== Theorist ==
Articulate and prolific, Lemagny participated in numerous conferences and colloquiums on photography in France and around the world, and published hundreds of articles and several major works on individual photographers, trends and themes in photography. He was invited to curate exhibitions for other institutions or to write accompanying text for their catalogues.

In 1989, Lemagny wrote:

"In photography, as in all art, what is of fundamental importance is not finding an idea but exploring matter manifest in forms. It is about sustaining a certain substance, from within which creativity can circulate."

In 1999 he meditates on the relation of photographer and collector;

"We come to think that the first collector is the photographer himself. It could be said, at a pinch, that a painter collects his paintings; but these are too completely the effect of his manual decisions for it to mean much. Whereas a photographer is first of all the one who, in the ocean of visual realities, chooses. By his gestures of choice, he has already initiated his artistic process. ... It follows that the collector of photos who is not himself a photographer is already, almost, a photographer. He shares with them an inaugural and necessary gesture: to choose. Hence the particular weight of the collections during the history of photography. Apart from the simple utility, any photo as part of a collection sees its plastic presence exalted by the proximity of others. The organization of a collection, its trends, its evolution, take part in the dynamics of art. They become almost creative gestures. And even totally creative, in sum, if we replace them in the broader context of contemporary art."

=== The aesthetic clock ===
In 1977 - and in a revision resumed in 1991 - he proposed a classification of photographs into four main categories selected from a random corpus of 237 photographs taken by the most diverse photographers including William Klein, Robert Frank, Emmanuel Sougez, Henri Cartier-Bresson, Christian Boltanski, Pierre Cordier, Don McCullin, Raoul Hausmann, Helen Sager, Jean-Pierre Sudre, Daniel Masclet, Josef Sudek, and others.

In 1977, this originally took the form of this matrix:

Lemagny's aesthetic matrix, 1977
	The picture as objective material reality	Conceptual photo as a pure idea of itself
The photo as a relationship to the inner world: surrealism	Object	Subject
The photo as a relationship to the outside world: reportage	Form	Ground

Divided and arranged in a circle, he called this grid of reflection on photography his “horloge esthétique” (‘aesthetic clock’): "For convenience, I suggest that you designate the different points of the circle as on a clock face: 12 o'clock at the top, 6 o'clock at the bottom, 3 o'clock on the right, 9 o'clock on the left, etc....I had distributed around a circle 237 extremely diverse slides, without any a priori, taking into account only the visual connections which spontaneously established between them." L'ombre et le temps published in 1992 sets out Lemagny's propositions about photography, to which the book's other contributors respond.

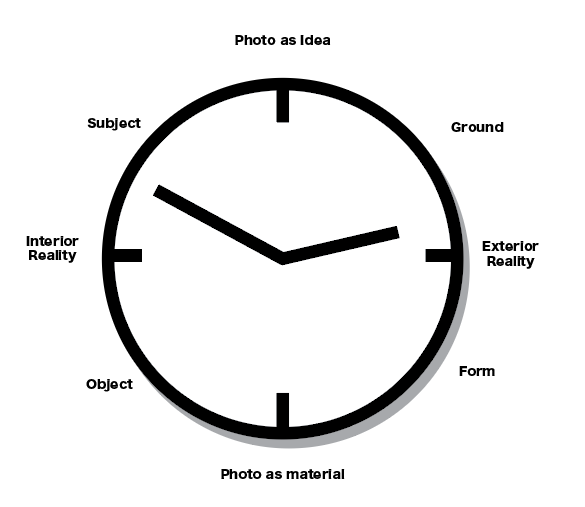
A representation of Lemagny's "horloge esthétique"

=== La Matiere, l'Ombre et la Fiction ===
Lemagny's exhibition and book La Matiere, l'Ombre et la Fiction, ('Matter, Shadow and Fiction') in 1994 which drew on the BNF collection of contemporary photographs, which he organised in panels based on his perceived resonance of one photograph with another rather than with something seen in each. His argument in the text, supported by examples from the BnF collection, proceeds from the question;

“In a world which now coincides the communicable and the immediate utilitarian, a world which even seems to have given up the critical substance of history, art has no more space in which to ferment. [A] radiant technical success resulting from a society which began to make everything permutable and exchangeable, does photography remain, paradoxically, a last small room where art could survive?”

The presentation provoked strong reactions.

== Rencontre Internationale d'Arles ==
Lemagny supported Lucien Clergue in organising in 1970 the first Rencontre Internationale d'Arles, an international photography festival, to which he was sometimes invited to give an official presentation, though he usually attended in a personal capacity. Bruce McCaig recalls that;

"Summer after summer, Lemagny could be found seated at a table often at the Hotel Arlatan, reviewing photographers' portfolios on a first-come-first-served basis. the line of hopeful artists sometimes stretching for blocks. He would take a break at noon to eat a sandwich and otherwise spent the day looking at and talking about hundreds of photographs."

== Publications ==
=== Books ===
- Lemagny, Jean-Claude. (n.d.). Pour une définition de l'art.
- Lemagny, J.-C. (n.d.). Giorgio Cutini: La danza delle forme = dancing of the forms. Giorgio Cutini : Immagini Dall'interno, Fotografie.
- Musée des arts décoratifs (France), Mathey, F., Lemagny, J.-C., & Marbot, B. (n.d.). La famille des portraits.
- Lemagny, Jean-Claude. (n.d.). Voies de la création dans la photographie contemporaine (Les).
- Lemagny, Jean-Claude. (n.d.). Voies de la création dans la photographie contemporaine (Les).
- Bovis, M., Doloy, R., Martin, G., Lefebvre, B., Robert, V., Lemagny, J.-C., Feinstein, G., ... Club photographique de paris. (1957). [Collection of greeting cards and announcements collected and edited by Marcel Bovis]: [photographie]. ([Collection of personal archives of Marcel Bovis].) S.l.: s.n..
- Angremy, A., Cain, J., Adhémar, J., Lemagny, J.-C., Didérot, D., & Bibliothèque nationale (France). (1963). Diderot: 1713-1784 : [[An exhibition catalogue. Compiled by Jean Adhémar and Jean Claude Lemagny. With portraits and facsimiles.]], Paris, Bibliothèque nationale, 1963. Paris: Impr. Tournon.
- Direction des musées de France., Lemagny, J.-C., Savanne, S., & ZUBER, M. T. (1964). La Société française du XVIIIe siècle vue par les peintres et les graveurs. Exposition itinérante du Service éducatif des musées. (Catalogue rédigé par S. Savanne, M.-Th. Zuber et J.-C. Lemagny.) [With illustrations.]. Paris.
- Angremy, A., Auer, E. M., Baron, F., Beaulieu, M., Caubet, A., Lacambre, J., Lemagny, J. C., ... Sauter, J. (1966). Kunst und Geist Frankreichs im 18. Jahrhundert.
- Lemagny, J.-C. & Cabinet des Estampes (Genf). (1966). Les architectes visionnaires de la fin du XVIIIe siècle Exposition ... Cabinet des estampes: Genève, 13 novembre 1965-30 janvier 1966. Genève: Musée d'art et d'histoire.
- Sudre, J.-P., Lemagny, J.-C., & Galerie La Demeure (Paris). (1972). Photographies Denis Brihat: [catalogue de l'exposition], Paris, Galerie La Demeure, 1972. Paris: Galerie La Demeure.Lemagny, J.-C., & Galleria Doria Arte Moderna (Torino). (1975). Alex Bianchi. Torino: Galleria Doria Arte Moderna.
- Dieuzaide, J., & Lemagny, J.-C. (1974). Mon aventure avec le brai. Toulouse] (7, rue Erasme, 31400: J. Dieuzaide.
- Gloeden, W. ., & Lemagny, J.-C. (1975). Taormina: Début de sciècle. Paris: Chêne.
- Gloeden, ., & Lemagny, . (1975). Taormina debut de siecle. Paris: Chêne.
- Gloeden, W. ., & Lemagny, J.-C. (1975). Taormina debut de siècle: Photographies du Baron de Gloeden. Paris: Ed. du Chêne.
- Lemagny, J.-C. (1977). Photographs of the classic male nude: Baron Wilhelm von Gloeden. New York: Camera/Graphic Press.
- Lemagny, J.-C., Butor, M., Strand, P., & Musée national d'art moderne (Paris). (1977). Paul Strand: [exposition, Paris, Centre national d'art et de culture Georges Pompidou, Musée national d'art moderne, 15 juin-15 août 1977]. Paris: Centre national d'art et de culture Georges Pimpidou.
- Salbitani, R., & Lemagny, J.-C. (1978). La città invasa. Modena: Punto e virgola.
- Lemagny, J.-C., Seguin, J. P., & Bibliothèque nationale (France). (1978). Gilles Caron: Reportages : [exposition], Bibliothèque nationale, Département des estampes et de la photographie, Galerie Louvois, du 2 mai au 3 juin 1978. Paris: Bibliothèque nationale.
- Bibliothèque nationale de France., & Lemagny, J.-C. (1979). [Recueil. Galerie de photographie de la Bibliothèque nationale. Catalogues. 1979-1997]. Paris: Galerie de photographie de la Bibliothèque nationale.
- Lemagny, J.-C., & Bibliothèque nationale (France). (1979). Espaces: Daniel Boudinet, Eric Johnson, Paul Joyce, Klaus Ritterbusch, Ellen Salwen, Chris Wainwright : [exposition, Paris, Galerie de photographie de la Bibliothèque nationale, avril-mai 1979]. Paris: Bibliothèque nationale.
- Lemagny, J.-C. (1980). European Portfolio. S.l.: s.n..
- Shuler, T. H., & Lemagny, J.-C. (1980). Portfolio I: Platinum palladium portfolio. S.l.: s.n..
- Triennale internationale de photographie, Lemagny, J.-C., & Palais des beaux-arts (Charleroi, Belgique). (1980). Première Triennale internationale de photographie, 1980: Palais des beaux-arts, Charleroi, Belgique. Charleroi: Photographie ouverte.
- Lamarche-Vadel, B., Henric, J., & Lemagny, J. C. (1980). Noir limite: Jean-Claude Bélégou, Florence Chevalier, Yves Trémorin. Sausseuzemare: Photographies And Co..
- Lemagny, J.-C. (1980). Photographie: Article pr. Encyclopedia Universalis, supplément, t. 2, p. 1151. Paris: s.n..
- Hopkinson, T., Lemagny, J.-C., & Goethe-Institut (Paris). (1981). Felix H. Man: 60 ans de photographie. Paris.
- Lemagny, J.-C. (1981). Le corps regardé: Images. Laplume: Association de Critique Contemporaine en Photographie (ACCP.
- Lemagny, J.-C. (1981). La photographie: Tendances récentes. (Actualité des arts plastiques.) Paris: CNDP.
- Ritterbusch, K., Schmalenbach, W., & Lemagny, J.-C. (1982). Der Fluss und die Berge: Fotografien und Texte. Freiburg: Herder.
- Lemagny, J.-C., Berswordt-Wallrabe, H. L. A., & Sougez, E. (1982). Emmanuel Sougez: Photographien : 1928-1953 : Bochum, Frankfurt/Main, Frankfurter Kunstverein, Stadt Museum Leverkusen, Schloss Morsbroich. Bochum: Galerie für Film Foto.
- Lemagny, J.-C., & Melot, M. (1982). François le Diascorn: [exposition], Paris, Bibliothèque nationale, Galerie de la photographie, 23 mars-17 avril 1982. Paris: Bibliothèque nationale.
- Catany, T., & Lemagny, J.-C. (1983). Tomas Monserrat: 1873-1944 : retratista d'un poble. "Sa Nostra": Palma de Mallorca.
- Lemagny, J.-C., Kritz, V., & Galerie Mansart (Paris). (1983). Vilem Kriz: Galerie Mansart 23 novembre 1983-15 janvier 1984. Paris: Bibliothèque Nationale.
- Lemagny, J.-C. (1984). 'Les collections de la Bibliothèque nationale: 15 ans denrichissement. Cet ouvrage a été réalisé à loccasion de lexposition 'La photographie créative' présentée par la Bibliothèque nationale au pavillon des Arts durant le Mois de la photo organisé par Paris Audiovisuel, Novembre - Décembre 1984'. Paris: Contrejour.
- Lemagny Jean-Claude, Bibliothèque nationale France, & Lemagny Jean-Claude. (1984). <<La >>Photographie créative Texte imprimé les collections de la Bibliothèque nationale 15 ans d'enrichissement [exposition, Paris, Pavillon des arts, novembre-décembre 1984]. Contrejour.
- Paris. Bibliothèque Nationale, & Lemagny, J.-C. (1984). Les collections de photographies contemporaines de la Bibliothèque Nationale. Paris: Contrejour.
- Baldassari, A. (1984). Le Territoire. Laplume: Association de critique contemporaine en photographie.
- Lemagny, J.-C., & Galerie municipale du Château d'eau (Toulouse). (1985). Le Diascorn: [exposition], Galerie municipale du Château d'eau ..., Toulouse, février 1985. Toulouse: Galerie municipale du Château d'eau.
- Gili, M., Lemagny, J.-C., Flusser, V., Mascaró, P. J., & Fundació Joan Miró (Barcelona, Spain). (1985). La ciutat fantasma: Octubre-novembre 1985, Fundació Joan Miró, Centre d'Estudis d'Art Contemporani.
- Mora, G., Clayssen, J., & Lemagny, J.-C. (1986). Les Photographes humanistes: Doisneau, Boubat, Izis et les autres. (Les Cahiers de la photographie (Marmande).) Paris: Cahiers de la photographie.
- Palazzolo, A., Lemagny, J. C., & Gilardi, A. (1986). Aldo Palazzolo: Portraits. S.l.: Artestudio.
- Lemagny, J.-C. (1986). L'occasion d'une recherche crétrice: L'architecture industrielle vue par 5 photographes : Jean-Jacques Bénichou, Vincent Monthiers, Gérard Dalla Santa, Hervé Rabot, Jacques Thomas : [exposition, Bordeaux, 1986]. Bordeaux: Conseil général de la Gironde.
- Lavrillier, C.-M., Roegiers, P., & Lemagny, J.-C. (1986). 6 [six] années du 666: Un entretien de Patrick Roegiers avec Carol Marc Lavrillier; [suivi de] La Galerie; préf. Jean-Claude Lemagny. Paris: Ed. Studio 666.
- Lemagny, J.-C. (1986). Elisabeth Sunday: The african portfolios. Los Angeles (calif.: Curatorial assistance.
- Soulages, F., & LEMAGNY, J.-C. (1986). Photographie et inconscient.
- Lemagny Jean-Claude, Rouillé André, Didi-Huberman Georges, Dubois Philippe, Hassner Rune, McCauley Anne, & Marbot Bernard. (1986). Histoire de la photographie Texte imprimé. Bordas.
- Batho, ., & Lemagny, . (1986). Giverny, la memoire d'un jardin. Aurillac: A.D.A.C.
- Lemagny, Jean-Claude; Rouille, Andre (1987), Jean-Claude Lemagny; Andre Rouille (eds.), A History of photography social and cultural perspectives, translated by Janet Lloyd, Cambridge University Press, ISBN 978-0-521-34407-4
- Lemagny, J.-C. (1987). Jean-Luc Maisonneuve: Cantates : [exposition, Paris], Bibliothèque nationale, Galerie de photographie, 30 avril-23 mai 1987. Lieu de publication non identifié: éditeur non identifié.
- Lemagny, J.-C. (1987). Kiuston Hallé: Les trois grâces : [exposition], Paris, Bibliothèque nationale, 29 octobre-28 novembre 1987. Paris: Bibliothèque nationale.
- Lemagny, J.-C., & Arrouye, J. (1987). Françoise Gimenez: [exposition, Paris], Bibliothèque nationale, Galerie de photographie, 19 mars-18 avril 1987. Lieu de publication non identifié: éditeur non identifié.
- Basilico, G., Bergala, A., Chomette, M., Clergue, L., Lemagny, J.-C., Malone, L., Troispoux, Y., ... Phonurgia nova (Arles, Bouches-du-Rhône). (1987). Infraviolet: Revue sonore de photographie. (Infraviolet.) Arles: Phonurgia Nova.
- Lemagny, J.-C. (1987). Elisabeth Sunday: [Paris], Galerie de photographie de la Bibliothèque nationale, 10 décembre 1987-16 janvier 1988. Paris: Bibliothèque nationale.
- Lemagny, Jean-Claude (1931-....). Auteur du texte. (1987). Jean-Luc Maisonneuve : Cantates : [exposition, Paris], Bibliothèque nationale, Galerie de photographie, 30 avril-23 mai 1987 / [catalogue réd. par Jean-Claude Lemagny]. s.n.][s.n..
- Lemagny, J.-C., & Caisse nationale des monuments historiques et des sites (France). (1987). Monuments en quête d'auteur. Paris: Service photographiques, Caisse nationale des monuments historique et des sites.
- Gouvion, S.-C. A., Lemagny, J.-C., & Sayag, A. (1988). Art of nature: 20th century French photography. London: Trefoil.
- Gouvion, S.-C. A., Lemagny, J.-C., Sayag, A., Barbican Art Gallery., & Association française d'action artistique. (1988). 20th century French photography. London: Published on behalf of Barbican Art Gallery by Trefoil Publications.
- La Photographie : tendances récentes, CNDP, 1986; réédition actualisée : La Photographie : tendances des années 1950–1980, CNDP, 2002.
- Gouvion, S.-C. A., Lemagny, J.-C., & Sayag, A. (1988). Art or nature: 20th century French photography. London: Trefoil Publ.
- Lemagny, J.-C., & Caroly, C. (1988). L'Ete: Les quatre saisons du territoire. Belfort, France: Granit-CAC.
- Naggar, A., & Lemagny, J.-C. (1988). André Naggar: Images mentales : 50 ans de photographie. Paris: Trianon de Bagatelle.
- Gormezano, G., Minot, P., Lemagny, J.-C., & Bibliothèque nationale (France). (1988). Minot et Gormezano: Galerie de photographie de la Bibliothèque nationale 17 mars-16 avril 1988. Paris: Bibliothèque nationale.
- Lemagny, J.-C. (1988). Clarence John Laughlin (1905–1985): [exposition, Paris], Galerie de photographie de la Bibliothèque nationale, 28 avril-28 mai 1988. Paris: Bibliothèque nationale.
- Caroly, C., & Buttard, A. (1988). Les Quatre saisons du territoire: [photographies]. Jarville-La-Malgrange: Editions de l'Est.
- Lemagny, J.-C. (1989). Hervé Crépet: [exposition, Paris], Galerie de photographie de la Bibliothèque nationale, 19 janvier - 19 février 1989. Paris: s.n..
- Lemagny, J.-C., & Sudre, J.-P. (1989). Jean-Pierre Sudre: [exposition], Galerie de photographie de la Bibliothèque nationale, Espace Colbert, 4 octobre-4 novembre 1989. Paris: Bibliothèque nationale.
- Centre Georges Pompidou, Lemagny, Jean-Claude, & Sayag, Alain. (1989). L Invention d un art. París: Adam Biro.
- Lemagny, J.-C., Picto Bastille (Paris), & Bibliothèque nationale (France). (1989). Eva Rubinstein: Galerie de photographie de la Bibliothèque nationale et Picto espace Picto Bastille ... 15 novembre [1989-11 janvier 1990]. Paris: Bibliothèque nationale.
- Gouvion, S.-C. A., Lemagny, J.-C., & Sayag, A. (1989). 20th century French photography. Rizzoli.
- Lemagny, J.-C. (1989). Bruce Gilden: [exposition], Paris, Bibliothèque nationale, Espace Colbert, 15 juin-13 juillet 1989. Paris: Bibliothèque nationale.
- Lemagny, J.-C. (1989). La Photographie creative. Paris: Contrejour.
- Lemagny, J.-C. (1989). Raymonde April: [exposition], Paris, Bibliothèque nationale, Galerie de la photographie, Espace Colbert, 27 avril-27 mai 1989. Paris: Bibliothèque nationale.
- Hitchcock, B., Lemagny, J.-C., Polaroid Corporation., & International Polaroid Collection. (1990). Selections 5: The International Polaroid Collection. Cambridge, Mass: Polaroid Corp.
- Lemagny, J.-C. (1990). Louis Faurer: [exposition], Paris, Bibliothèque nationale, Galerie de photographie, Espace Colbert, 19 avril-19 mai 1990. Paris: Bibliothèque nationale.
- Kertész, A., Bonhomme, P., Phillips, S. S., Jammes, I., Lemagny, J.-C., Frizot, M., Musée d'art et d'essai (Paris, France), ... Association pour la diffusion du patrimoine photographique (France). (1990). Ma France. Paris: La Manufacture/Ministere de la Culture.
- Roegiers, P., Lemagny, J.-C., Mora, G., Contemporary Arts Center (New Orleans, La.), & Alliance française de la Nouvelle Orleans. (1990). En liberté: Contemporary French photography. New Orleans: Contemporary Arts Center.
- Naggar, A., & Lemagny, J.-C. (1990). André Naggar: Le regard éclaté : [exposition, Paris, Patrick Perrin, 1990]. Paris: P. Perrin.
- Sudre, J.-P., & Lemagny, J.-C. (1990). Photographies: Douze natures mortes 1948–1953. Paris: s.n..
- Lemagny, J.-C., & Bibliothèque nationale (France). (1990). Caroline Feyt: "Toros : [exposition], Paris, Bibliothèque nationale, Galerie de photographie, Rotonde Colbert, 25 janvier-24 février 1990. Paris: Bibliothèque nationale.
- Lemagny, J.-C. (1990). Jean-Luc Mylayne: [Paris], Galerie de photographie de la Bibliothèque nationale, passage Colbert, 1 août-1 septembre 1990. Paris: Bibliothèque nationale.
- Heyward, M., & Lemagny, J.-C. (1990). Bill Henson: Paris, Galerie de photographie de la Bibliothèque nationale, passage Colbert, 20 septembre-20 octobre. Paris: Bibliothèque nationale.
- Lemagny, J.-C. (1991). Hiromi Tsuchida ou l'ambiguïté sans fin. S.l.?.
- Lemagny, J.-C., & Bibliothèque nationale (France). (1991). Mark Feldstein: Galerie de la photographie de la Bibliothèque nationale, passage Colbert, Paris, 19 janvier-9 février 1991. Paris: Bibliothèque nationale.
- Lemagny, J.-C., & Macaire, A. (1991). Rossella Bellusci: Oeuvre photographique 1981-1990 : Bibliothèque nationale, Paris, 17 avril-25 mai 1991, Centre d'art contemporain de Basse-Normandie, Hérouville Saint-Clair, 1992. Paris: Canal.
- Lemagny, J.-C., & Dufour, B. (1991). Bernard Dufour: [exposition], Paris, Bibliothèque nationale, Galerie Colbert, 30 mai-13 juillet 1991. Paris: Bibliothèque nationale.
- Lemagny, J.-C. (January 1, 1991). Lumières dans la cathédrale. Recherche Photographique : Histoire-Esthétique.
- Lemagny, J.-C., Cueco, H., & Vitry-sur-Seine (Val-de-Marne). (1992). Marie-Jésus Diaz, photographies: [exposition], Galerie municipale, 23 février-15 mars 1992, Ville de Vitry-sur-Seine. Vitry-sur-Seine: Galerie municipale.
- Lemagny, J.-C., Giteau, C., & Christout, M.-F. (1992). Fernand Michaud: [exposition], Paris, Bibliothèque nationale, Galerie de la photographie, Galerie des Arts du spectacle, 27 février-28 mars 1992. Paris: Bibliothèque nationale.
- Giriat, V., Quignard, P., & Lemagny, J.-C. (1992). Véronique Giriat: [exposition], Paris, Bibliothèque nationale, Passage Colbert, Galerie de la photographie, 8 avril-23 mai 1992. Paris: Bibliothèque nationale.
- Lemagny, J.-C. (1992). Nouvelles rencontres: Bruno Cordonnier, Emmanuel Pinard, Monique Dérégibus, Olivier Umhauer, Julie Gauzin, Bertrand Valentin, Jean Guerre, Xavier Zimmermann : [exposition], Paris, Bibliothèque nationale, Galerie Colbert, 19 novembre-19 décembre 1992. Paris: Bibliothèque nationale.
- Lemagny, J.-C. (1992). François Puyplat: [exposition], Paris, Bibliothèque nationale, Galerie de la photographie, 16 janvier-15 février 1992. Paris: Bibliothèque nationale.
- Ehrmann, G., & Lemagny, J.-C. (1993). Faire un pas. Paris: Hazan.
- Lemagny, J.-C., & Rouillé, A. (1993). Photographie. Paris: Bordas.
- Lemagny, J.-C. (1993). Yves Trémorin: Catherine : Paris, Bibliothèque nationale, passage Colbert, galerie de la photographie, 29 juillet-28 août 1993. Paris: Bibliothèque nationale.
- Lemagny, J.-C. (1993). Ann Mandelbaum: [exposition, Paris], Bibliothèque nationale, Passage Colbert, Galerie de la Photographie, 29 avril-29 mai 1993. Paris: Bibliothèque nationale.
- Lemagny, J.-C. (1993). Geneviève Hofman: [exposition], Bibliothèque nationale, passage Colbert, galerie de la photographie, [16 octobre-20 novembre 1993]. Paris: Bibliothèque nationale.
- Lemagny, J.-C. (1993). Julien Coulommier: Bibliothèque nationale, Passage Colbert, Galerie de la photographie ..., Paris, du 12 mars au 10 avril 1993. Paris: Bibliothèque nationale.
- Lemagny, J.-C. (1994). Jean-Pierre Bonfort: [exposition], Paris, Bibliothèque nationale de France, Galerie de photographie, Passage Colbert, 17 mars-16 avril 1994. Paris: Bibliothèque nationale.
- Mai de la photo, & Lemagny, J.-C. (1994). Reims, Mai de la photo. Reims: Priorité Ouverture.
- Lemagny, J.-C. (1994) La Matière, l’Ombre, la Fiction : photographie contemporaine. Récents enrichissements du département des Estampes et de la Photographie, BNF et Nathan.
- Lemagny, J.-C. (1994). Jean Luc Tartarin: Fragments : Bibliothèque nationale, Galerie de la photographie, Passage Colbert ..., Paris, 13 janvier-12 février 1994. Paris: Bibliothèque nationale.
- Baqué, D., Lemagny, J.-C., Müller, S., & Ecole des beaux-arts (Metz, France). (1994). Knut Wolfgang Maron: Des paysages, des animaux, des hommes et des choses, 1980-1994 : [exposition] Ecole des beaux-arts de Metz, 15 février - 19 mars 1995 -- Kunsthalle Kühlungsborn, 10 Juni - 13 Juli 1995. Metz: Ecole des beaux-arts.
- aboulin, S., & Lemagny, J.-C. (1994). Mai de la photo: Du 2 au 5 juin 1994. Reims: Priorité Ouverture.
- Maron, K. W. (1994). [Knut Wolfgang Maron]: Bilder über Landschaften, Tiere, Menschen und Dinge : 1980-1994 : [Ausstellung, École des Beaux-Arts, Metz, 15.02.-19.03.1995 ... etc.]. Erscheinungsort nicht ermittelbar: Verlag nicht ermittelbar.
- Lemagny, J.-C., Milovanoff, C., Biroleau, A., & Bibliothèque nationale de France. (1994). Tadashi Ono: [exposition, juin-9 juillet 1994, Paris, Bibliothèque nationale de France], Galerie de la photographie, Passage Colbert. Paris: Bibliothèque nationale de France.
- Pla, J. J., Formiguera, P., Lemagny, J.-C., Perego, E., & Fundació Caixa de Pensions (Barcelona). (1995). Joaquim Pla Janini: [exposición]. Barcelona: Fundación "la Caixa".
- Andrade, A., Lemagny, J.-C., & Bibliothèque nationale de France. (1995). Alain Andrade photographies. Paris: Bibliothèque nationale de France.
- Perego, E., Lemagny, J.-C., & Fundació Caixa de pensions. (1995). Joaquim Pla Janini: Exposició, Barcelona, 20 de desembre-11 de febrer de 1996, Sala Tarragona de la Fundació La Caixa, 15 d'abril-26 de maig de 1996, 25 de setembre-3 de novembre de 1996, Fundació La Caixa Illes Balears. Barcelona: Fundació "La Caixa.
- Maron, K. W., Baqué, D., Lemagny, J.-C., Müller, S., Ecole des beaux-arts (Metz, France), & Kunsthalle Kühlungsborn. (1994). Des paysages, des animaux: Des hommes et des choses, 1980-1994. Metz: Ecole des beaux-arts.
- Yates, Steven A (1995), Poetics of space a critical photographic anthology (1st ed.), University of New Mexico Press, ISBN 978-0-8263-1522-9
- Lemagny, J.-C. (1995). Gilbert Fastenaeken: Photographies : [Bibliothèque nationale de France, Galerie Colbert, du 13 juin au 20 juillet 1995]. Paris: Bibliothèque nationale de France.
- Lemagny, J.-C. (1995). Jacques Bacry photographies: [exposition, Paris], Bibliothèque nationale de France, Salle de lecture du Cabinet des estampes, mai-juin 1995. Lieu de publication non identifié: éditeur non identifié.
- Monreal, A. L., & Lemagny, J.-C. (1995). Joaquim Pla Janini. Barcelona: Fundación "La Caixa".
- Carli, E., & Lemagny, J.-C. (1995). Mario Giacomelli: La forma dentro, fotografie 1952-1995 : [mostra, Senigallia, Rocca Roveresca, 29 luglio-30 settembre 1995]. Milano: Charta.
- Luke, M., Lemagny, J.-C., Toth, C., Biroleau, A., & Bibliothèque nationale de France. (1996). Michelle Luke: Photographies. Paris: Bibliothèque nationale de France, Galerie Colbert.
- Lemagny, J.-C. (1996). Madeleine de Sinéty: Photographies. Paris: Bibliothèque nationale de France.
- Lemagny, J.-C. (1996). Nouvelles de la photographie. Paris: Comité national de la gravure française.
- Lemagny, J.-C., Aubenas, S., & McCauley, E. A. (1996). Charles Aubry photographe : [exposition Bibliothèque nationale de France, galerie Colbert du 7 mars au 4 mai 1996]. Paris: Bibliothèque nationale de France.
- Lemagny, J.-C. (1996). Michelle Luke: Photographies. Paris: Bibliothèque nationale de France.
- Lemagny, J.-C. (1996). Denise Colomb: "portraits". Lyon: Ed. La Manufacture.
- Lemagny, Jean Claude. (1996). Serge Clément : De l’apparition à la présence. Les Productions Ciel variable.
- Zimbardo, X., & LEMAGNY, J. E. A. N. C. L. A. U. D. E. (1996). LES BELLES DISPARUES. O.O: ED. NATIVES.
- Lemagny Jean-Claude. (1996). Denise Colomb Texte imprimé portraits. Éd. la Manufacture.
- Lorblanchet, M., Lemagny, J.-C., Onfray, M., & Haute-Normandie. (1996). Siloé-Orellana: [exposition, Rouen, Conseil régional de Haute-Normandie, 15 novembre 1996-1er mars 1997]. Rouen: Région Haute-Normandie.
- Zimbardo, X., & Lemagny, J.-C. (1996). Les belles disparues. Paris: Natives.
- Beretta, S., & Lemagny, J.-C. (1997). Paris noir. Tesserete (Biolda: Pagine d'arte.
- Lemagny, J.-C., Musée Sainte-Croix (Poitiers, Vienne)., & Société des antiquaires de l'Ouest. (1997). Fernand Michaud: [exposition, Poitiers, Musée Sainte-Croix, 16 octobre 1997 - 4 janvier 1998].
- Lemagny, J.-C., Laude, A., & Bibliothèque nationale de France. (1997). Rasi: Photographies : [exposition, Bibliothèque nationale de France, Galerie Colbert, 6 février-6 avril 1997]. Paris: Bibliothèque nationale de France.
- Ehrmann, G., Lemagny, J.-C., Mercié, J. L., Orbestier, F., Abbaye aux Dames (Saintes, France), & Galerie municipale du Château d'eau. (1998). Gilles Ehrmann. Saintes: Abbaye aux Dames.
- Gibson, M., & Lemagny, J.-C. (1998). André Naggar: Images mentales. Paris: Cercle d'art.
- Szulc-Krzyzanowski, M., Lemagny, J. C., Van, . W. S., & Römer, P. (1998). Vista. Amsterdam: Focus.
- Lemagny, Jean-Claude. (1998). Die vermessene Mauer: Aarhus, Dänemark 1985. S.l.: Lemagny, Jean-Claude [distrib..
- IJzermans, T., & Lemagny, J.-C. (1998). Michel Szulc-Krzyzanowski: Vista. Amsterdam: Focus.
- Tartaglia, ., Lemagny, ., & Ravasi, B. (1998). Appartenenze. Tavagnacco: Art&.
- Lemagny, J.-C., Ravasi, B. L., Tartaglia, D., Tartaglia, D., & Tartaglia, D. (1998). Daniela Tartaglia: Appartenenze. Tavagnacco (UD: Art &.
- Szulc-Krzyzanowski, M., Lemagny, J.-C., IJzermans, T., & De Beyerd (Bréda, Pays-Bas). (1998). Vista: [exhibition, Breda, De Beyern, museum of modern art, 22 February-20 April 1998].
- Lemagny Jean-Claude, & Brabo Michèle. (1998). Itinéraire affectif d'une photographe Texte imprimé. Éd. Recherches.
- Tartaglia, D., Lemagny, J.-C., & Ravasi, B. L. (1998). Daniela Tartaglia: Appartenenze. Arti Grafiche Friulane.
- Mercié, J.-L., Lemagny, J.-C., & Orbestier, F. (1998). Gilles Ehrmann photographe: [exposition Abbaye aux Dames, Saintes, 1998; Galerie du Château d'Eau, Toulouse, 1998]. Cognac: Le Temps qu'il fait.
- Tartaglia, D., Lemagny, J.-C., & Ravasi, B. L. (1998). Appartenenze.
- Soulages, F., Lemagny, J.-C., Soulages, F., & Bibliothèque nationale de France. (1999). La photographie du sans-art à l'art: Conférence du 8 novembre 1994. Paris: Bibliothèque nationale de France.
- Lemagny, J.-C. (1999). La Bretagne: Collection photographique de l'Imagerie : 42 photographes. Trézélan: Filigranes.
- Lemagny, J.-C., Lemagny, J.-C., Soulages, F., & Bibliothèque nationale de France. (1999). La parole est aux oeuvres: Conférence du 11 janvier 1995. Paris: Bibliothèque nationale de France.
- Lemagny, J.-C., Soulages, F., Lemagny, J.-C., & Bibliothèque nationale de France. (1999). La photographie et le musée imaginaire: Conférence du 29 novembre 1994. Paris: Bibliothèque nationale de France.
- Rencontres internationales de la photographie, Lemagny, J.-C., & Biroleau, A. (1999). Le corps du visible: Une exposition créée par Klee inc. et présentée du 7 juillet au 19 août 1999 aux Rencontres internationales de la photographie à Arles ... puis à l'automne 2000 au Musée municipal de Kawasaki. (Rencontres d'Arles.) Tokyo (5–3–3, Minami Azabu, Minato-ku: Klee Inc.
- Soulages, F., Lemagny, J.-C., Soulages, F., & Bibliothèque nationale de France. (1999). Anthropogénie et photographie: Conférence du 22 novembre 1994. Paris: Bibliothèque nationale de France.
- Barraco, D., & Lemagny, J.-C. (1999). El sentimiento tragico del instante. Mendoza: Lom ed.
- Argalia, ., Filosa, ., Lemagny, ., Mozzoni, ., & Pieralisi, . (1999). Fluisce alla terra il cielo. Jesi: Fondazione Cassa di Risparmio di Jesi.
- Argalia, A., & Lemagny, J.-C. (1999). Fluisce alla terra il cielo. Jesi: Fondazione cassa di risparmio di Jesi.
- Rodríguez, J. A., Lemagny, J.-C., & Colorado, A. (2000). Corps et fruit. Mexico: La Bamba.
- Lemagny, J.-C., & Biroleau, A. (2000). Eloge de l'ombre: [exposition, Kawasaki, Musée municipal, 3 novembre-17 décembre 2000, Yamaguchi, Musée départemental des beaux-arts 9-28 janvier 2001]. Paris: Klee Inc.
- Lemagny, J.-C., Hotel de Sully (Paris), & International Center of Photography. (2000). Atget the pioneer [published to accompany the exhibition held at the Hotel de Sully, Paris, 23 June - 17 September 2000; International Center of Photography, New York, 7 October 2000-21 January 2001]. Munich: Prestel.
- Lemagny, J.-C., Atget, E., Aubenas, S., Hôtel de Sully (Paris), & International Center of Photography. (2000). Atget, Le Pionnier. PARIS: MARVAL.
- Abrahmov, S. L., Schwander, L., & Lemagny, J.-C. (2001). Skønhed. Copenhagen?: Fotografisk Center.
- Lemagny, J.-C. (2001). Jean-Pierre Sudre, 1921-1997: [exposition, Saragosse, Institut français, 2001]. Saragosse: Institut français.
- Sousa, A. ., Chambon, J.-P., Lemagny, J.-C., & Espace Vallès ( Saint-Martin-d'Hères). (2001). Aurore de Sousa, autoportraits, l'ombre nue, l'etrangère intime. Saint-Martin-d'Hères: Espace Vallès.
- Scimone, A., Lemagny, J.-C., Gulizia, D., & Trevisan, P. (2002). Attilio Scimone: Materia e luce.
- Lemagny, J. C. (2002). La photographie: Tendences des années 1950-1980. Paris: CNDP.
- Masats, R., Monzó, J. V., Cuallado, G., & Institut valencià d'art modern-Centre Julio González. (2003). Homenatge a Gabriel Cuallado: Exposicio, Valencia, Institut Valencia d'art modern, 7 novembre 2003-11 gener 2004. Valencia: Institut Valencia d'art modern.
- Lebas, C., Lemagny, J.-C., & Schultz, D. (2003). Chrystel Lebas: Time in space = l'espace temps. London: Azure publ.
- Dieuzaide, J., Lemagny, J.-C., & Galerie municipale du Château d'eau (Tuluza). (2004). Une vie de photographes. Toulouse: Le château d'eau.
- Lemagny, J.-C., Dambrine, M., Lawrence, J. H., & Bernard Dudoignon (Paris). (2004). Clarence John Laughlin: [exposition, Paris], Bernard Dudoignon photographies, [automne 2004]. Paris (133 rue de Charonne, 75011: Bernard Dudoignon photographies.
- Magalhães, M., Furtado, J. A., & Lemagny, J.-C. (2004). Manuel Magalhães: Álbum 1973–2003. Porto: Edições Caixotim.
- Magalhães, M., Furtado, J. A., & Lemagny, J.-C. (2004). Manuel Magalhaes: Album 1973/2003. Porto: Ed. Caixotim.
- Lemagny, J.-C., & Hansen, B. (2004). Terra magica. Anglet: Atlantica.
- Magalhães, M., & Lemagny, J.-C. (2004). Manuel Magalhães: Álbum, 1973/2003. Porto: Ediçoes Caixotim.
- Lemagny, J.-C. (2005). L'ombre et le temps: Essais sur la photographie comme art. Paris: A. Colin.Le marieur d'images, (autour de Christian Milovanoff), Galerie Françoise Paviot, 2012–2013.
- Barraco, D., & Centro Cultural Estación Mapocho (Chile). (2005). Fotografías. Chile: Centro Cultural de la Estación Mapocho, Sala Joaquín Edward Bello.
- Lemagny, J.-C. (2005). La photographie: Tendances des années 1950–1980. Paris: Centre National de Documentation Pédagogique.
- Lemagny, J.-C. (2006). De l'image photographique aux mots: Essai d'itinéraire. Aix-en-Provence: PUP.
- Bertolotti, A., & Lemagny, J.-C. (2007). Livres de nus: Avant-propos de Jean-Claude Lemagny, 10 octobre 2007au 6 janvier 2008, Maison européenne de la Photographie, Paris. Paris: Éditions de la Martinière.
- Banville, J., Lemagny, J.-C., & Fuentes, C. (2008). Manuel Alvarez Bravo: Photopoetry. London: Thames & Hudson.
- Biroleau, A. (2008). 70', la photographie américaine: Diane Arbus, Lewis Baltz, Harry Callahan : [exposition, Paris, Bibliothèque nationale de France, site Richelieu, 29 octobre 2008-25 janvier 2009]. Paris: Bibliothèque nationale de France.
- Biroleau, A., & Bibliothèque nationale de France. (2008). 70', le choc de la photographie américaine: Exposition présentée à Paris, Bibliothèque nationale de France, site Richelieu, du 29 octobre 2008 au 25 janvier 2009. Paris: Bibliothèque Nationale de France.
- Breton-Hourcq, A. (2008). Tracés. Marseille (19 rue des Trois-rois, 13006: Atelier De visu.
- Carli, E., Lemagny, J. C., De, S. E., & Cutini, G. (2009). Immagini dall'interno: Fotografie. Ancona: Il lavoro editoriale.
- Alvarez, B. M., Alvarez, U. C., Banville, J., Lemagny, J.-C., Fuentes, C., & Sugiyama, E. (2011). Manueru arubaresu burabo shashinshu: Mekishiko no genso to hikari.
- Lauzon, Jean, Durand, Régis, Lemagny, Jean-Claude, & Rouillé, André. (2011). Images de la photographie. Les Presses philosophiques.
- Soulages, François, de Chassey, Eric, Poivert, Michel, Rouillé, André, Lemagny, Jean-Claude, Chateau, Dominique, Sagot-Duvauroux, Dominique, ... Tamisier, Marc. (2012). Photographie contemporaine & art contemporain. Klincksieck.
- Lemagny, Jean-Claude (2013). Silence de la photographie. Paris: L'Harmattan Editions Distribution.
- Bréhant, M.-L., Slivance, I., Gicquel, S., Lemagny, J.-C., & Gicquel, P. (2014). Les creusets de Marie-Louise: [livre d'artiste]. Nantes: Musée de l'imprimerie de Nantes & Couleur dite Parole peinte.
- Bastide, A.-G. (2018). L'invisible labyrinthe des temps: It's only photography's : dans les miroirs des vitrines de Paris. Paris: Alain-Gilles Bastide.
- Bohbot, M., & Lemagny, J.-C. (2020). Passion couleur. Baden: Lammerhuber.

=== Articles ===
- Lemagny, J.-C. (January 1, 1974). La femme vue par une femme, Henriette Grindat. Oeil : Magazine International D'art.
- Lemagny, J.-C. (January 1, 1978). Trois regards sur l'apparence. Connaissance Des Arts, 50–57.
- Lemagny, J.-C. (January 1, 1980). Tendances de la créativité contemporaine. Monuments Historiques / Ed. Par La Cnmhs.
- Lemagny, J.-C. (January 1, 1980). Un art trompeur, la photo couleur. Connaissance Des Arts, 62–69.
- Lemagny, J.-C. (January 1, 1986). Monuments en quête d'auteur. Monuments Historiques / Ed. Par La Cnmhs, 81–89.
- Lemagny, J.-C. (November 1, 1988). Un art en chemin vers lui-même. Revue Des Deux Mondes, 232–241.
- Lemagny, J.-C. (January 1, 1989). L' invention d'un art: Quand la photographie prend sa place dans une aussi vieille histoire que celle de l'art. Nouvelles De L'estampe / Publ. Par Le Comité National De La Gravure Française Et Le Cabinet Des Estampes De La Bibliothèque Française, 34–35.
- Lemagny, J.-C. (April 1, 1989). Splendeurs et misères du corps humain. Revue Des Deux Mondes, 236–243.
- Lemagny, J.-C. (October 1, 1989). Une autre objectivité. Revue Des Deux Mondes, 235–248.
- Lemagny, J.-C. (March 1, 1990). Cent cinquante ans après. Revue Des Deux Mondes, 231–239.
- Lemagny, J.-C. (January 1, 1992). Fleuve profond: Sur l'évolution de la création photographique depuis vingt ans. Art Press.
- Lemagny, J. C., Roth, K., Blouin, M., Legendre, R., & Michel, F. (December 7, 1996). Serge Clément: De l’apparition à la présence. Cv Photo, 36, 23–32.
- Lemagny interview with Alin Avila, "De la forme", in Area revue no 3, page 67 ff., 2002.
- Lemagny, J.-C. (January 1, 2006). La Galerie permanente de photographie: 1971–1996. Nouvelles De L'estampe, 209, 21.
- Lemagny, J.-C. (January 1, 2006). De l'image photographique aux mots: Essai d'itinéraire. Des Regards Aux Mots / Réunies Par Alain Chareyre-Méjan, 67–71.
