= William Gedney =

American photographer

William Gale Gedney
- Born: October 29, 1932; Greenville, New York
- Died: June 23, 1989 (aged 56); Greenville, New York
- Education: Pratt Institute, Brooklyn, New York
- Occupations: documentary photographer, street photographer
- Years active: 1950s—1980s
- Known for: Kentucky series

William Gale Gedney (October 29, 1932 – June 23, 1989) was an American documentary and street photographer. It wasn't until after his death that his work gained momentum and is now widely recognized. He is best known for his series on rural Kentucky, and series on India, San Francisco and New York shot in the 1960s and 1970s.

== Early life and background ==
He was born in Greenville, New York. He studied at Pratt Institute in Brooklyn, New York. In 1955 he graduated with a BFA in Graphic Design and began work with Condé Nast.

== Career ==
During his lifetime, Gedney received several fellowships and grants, including a John Simon Guggenheim Memorial Foundation fellowship from 1966 to 1967, a Fulbright Fellowship for photography in India from 1969 to 1971, a New York State Creative Artists Public Service Program (C.A.P.S.) grant from 1972 to 1973; and a National Endowment for the Arts grant from 1975 to 1976. In a career spanning late 1950s to the mid-1980s, he created a large body of work, including series documenting local communities during his travels to India, San Francisco, Brooklyn and New York shot in 1960s and 1970s. He is also noted for night photography, principally of large structures, like the Brooklyn bridge and architecture, and architectural studies of neighbourhoods quiet and empty, in the night.

In 1969, he started teaching at Pratt Institute, though later in 1987, two years before his death, he was denied tenure.

Gedney's work has been exhibited in numerous group shows, including Museum of Modern Art shows, Photography Current Report in 1968, Ben Schultz Memorial Collection in 1969, and Recent Acquisitions in 1971; as well as Vision and Expression, George Eastman House, and Rochester Institute of Technology, in 1972. However, he remained a recluse, had only one solo exhibition during his lifetime. Despite receiving appreciation from noted photographers of the time, Walker Evans, Diane Arbus, Lee Friedlander, and John Szarkowski, he remained an under-appreciated artist of the generation. He didn't manage to get any of his eight book projects published.

William Gedney died of complications from AIDS in 1989, aged 56, in New York City and is buried in Greenville, New York, a few short miles from his childhood home. He left his photographs and writings to his lifelong friend Lee Friedlander. In time, Friedlander's efforts, which had earlier led to the revival of E. J. Bellocq's works, chartered posthumous revival of Gedney's work.

An extensive collection of his work, including large photographic prints, work prints, contact sheets, negatives, sketchbooks, notebooks and diaries, correspondence, and other files are housed at the Rubenstein Library, Duke University, Durham, North Carolina.

== Bibliography ==
- What Was True: The Photographs and Notebooks of William Gedney. New York; London: Center for Documentary Studies' W.W. Norton, 2000. Edited by Margaret Sartor and Geoff Dyer. ISBN 0-393-04824-1.
- William Gedney: Only the Lonely 1955–1984. University of Texas, 2017. Gilles Mora, Lisa McCarty, and Margaret Sartor. ISBN 978-1-4773-1483-8.
