= Lucien Clergue =

French photographer

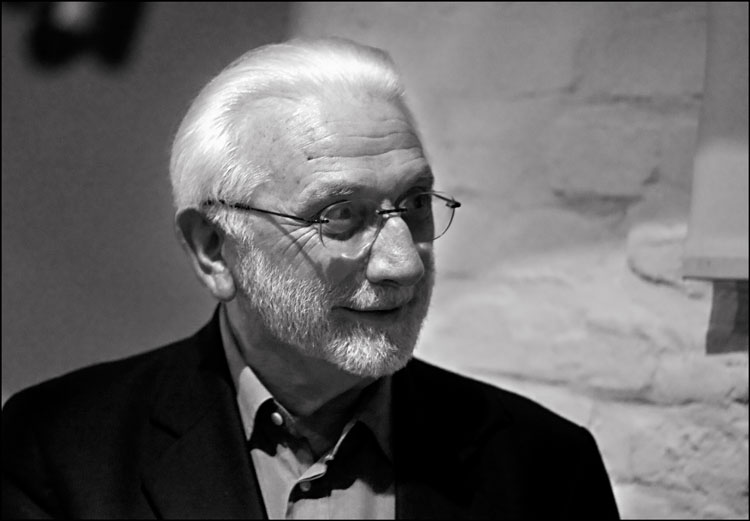
- Clergue on occasion of the retrospective, Vienna, 2007.
- Born: 14 August 1934; Arles, France
- Died: 15 November 2014 (aged 80); Nîmes, France
- Occupation: Photographer
- Website: lucien-clergue.com/en/

Lucien Clergue (French: [klɛʁg]; 14 August 1934 – 15 November 2014) was a French photographer. He was Chairman of the Academy of Fine Arts, Paris for 2013.

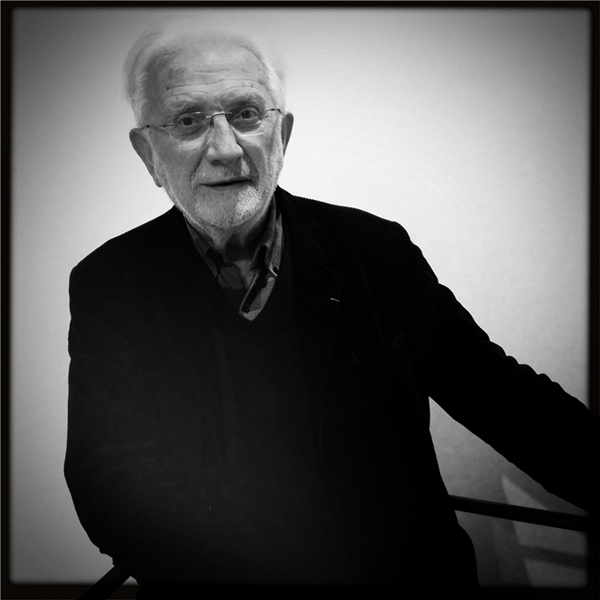
Clergue in January 2013 (Photo: François Besch)

== Biography ==
Lucien Clergue was born in Arles, France. At the age of 7 he began learning to play the violin, and after several years of study his teacher admitted that he had nothing more to teach him. Clergue was from a family of shopkeepers and could not afford to pursue further studies in a college or university school of music, such as a conservatory.

In 1949, he learned the basics of photography. Four years later, at a corrida in Arles, he showed his photographs to Spanish painter Pablo Picasso who, though subdued, asked to see more of his work. Within a year and a half, young Clergue worked on his photography with the goal of sending more images to Picasso. During this period, he worked on a series of photographs of travelling entertainers, acrobats and harlequins, the « Saltimbanques ». He also worked on a series whose subject was carrion.

== Friendship with Picasso ==
On 4 November 1955 Lucien Clergue visited Picasso in Cannes, France. Their friendship lasted nearly 30 years until Picasso's death. Clergue's autobiographical book, Picasso My Friend, looks back on important moments of their relationship.

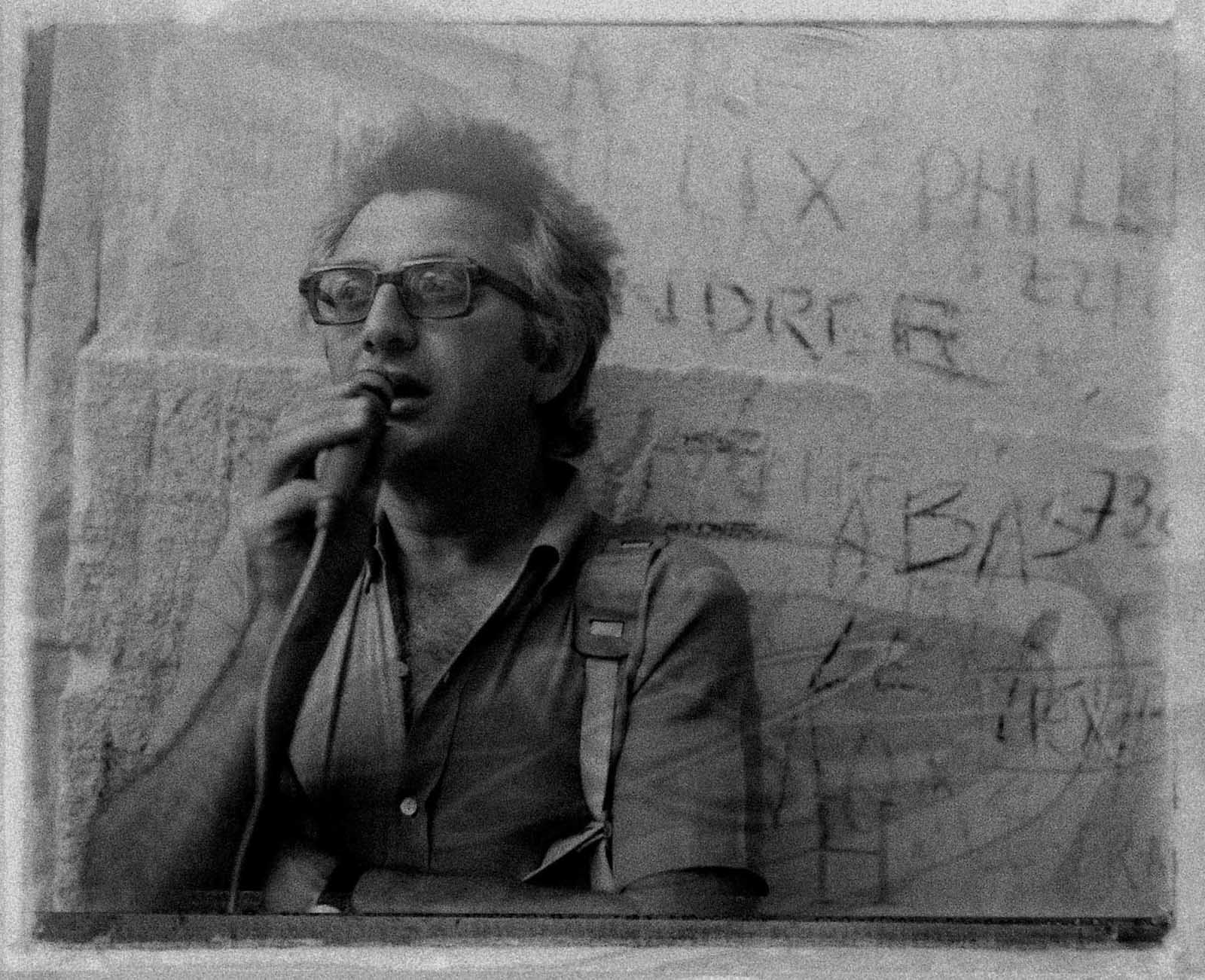
Rencontres d'Arles, 1975

== Career and legacy ==
In 1968, and with his friend Michel Tournier, Clergue founded the Rencontres d’Arles photography festival which is held annually in July in Arles. He exhibited his work at the festival during the years 1971–1973, 1975, 1979, 1982–1986, 1989, 1991, 1993, 1994, 2000, 2003 and 2007.

Clergue also illustrated books, among them a book by writer Yves Navarre.

Clergue took many photographs of the gypsies of southern France, and was instrumental in propelling the guitarist Manitas de Plata to fame.

Clergue's photographs are in the collections of numerous well-known museums and private collectors. His photographs have been exhibited in over 100 solo exhibitions worldwide, with noted exhibitions such as in 1961, at the Museum of Modern Art New York, the last exhibition organized by Edward Steichen with Lucien Clergue, Bill Brandt and Yasuhiro Ishimoto. Museums with large collections of his work include The Fogg Museum at Harvard University and the Museum of Fine Arts, Boston. His work, Fontaines du Grand Palais (Fountains of the Grand Palais), is in Museo cantonale d'arte of Lugano. His photographs of Jean Cocteau are on permanent display at the Jean Cocteau Museum in Menton, France. In the U.S., an exhibition of the Cocteau photographs was premiered at Westwood Gallery, New York City.

In 2007, the city of Arles honored Lucien Clergue and dedicated a retrospective collection of 360 of his photographs dating from 1953 to 2007. He also received the 2007 Lucie Award.

Lucien Clergue was represented on the West Coast by Louis Stern Fine Arts. The gallery mounted several major exhibitions of his work in 2006, 2009, and 2012 (the first two with published catalogues).

== Election as Member of the Academy of Fine Arts ==
He was named Knight of the Légion d'honneur in 2003 and elected member of the Academy of Fine Arts of the Institute of France on 31 May 2006, at the same time as a new section dedicated to photography was created. Clergue was the first photographer to enter the Academy to a position devoted specifically to photography.

He was Chairman of the Academy of Fine Arts for 2013.

== Personal life ==
Lucien Clergue was married to the art curator Yolande Clergue, founder of The Fondation Vincent van Gogh Arles. He was the father of two daughters: Anne Clergue, a curator of contemporary art who has worked at Leo Castelli Gallery, and Olivia Clergue, a handbag fashion designer whose godfather was Pablo Picasso.

== Publications ==
- Corps mémorable, Pierre Seghers editions, Paris, 1957. Poems by Paul Éluard, cover by Pablo Picasso, introductory poem by Jean Cocteau.
  - Re-released in 1960 without Cocteau's poem, then in 1963 in a German version where censors imposed changes to one of the dozen photos. It was again re-released in 1965 with all the text in black.
  - In 1969, an updated edition with added photos and new marquetry was published.
  - In 1996, on the occasion of the poet's centenary, another edition was published with new photos and a marquette designed by Massin (ISBN 978-2-221-08423-6).
  - In 2003, a final edition was released. An exposition organized by the Carré d'Art of Nîmes at the end of 2006 celebrated the 50-year anniversary of this legendary work.
- Poésie Photographique = Photographic Poetry. Munich, Germany: Prestel Publishing, 2003. Edited by Eva-Monika Turck. ISBN 3-7913-2850-6. With a foreword by Manfred Heiting and a contribution by Ivo Kranzfelder. English, French and German editions.
- Langage des Sables, Agep, Marseilles, 1980, ISBN 2-902634-08-0
- Portraits, Actes Sud, Arles, 2005, ISBN 2-7427-5423-7
- Toros Muertos (1966) published in the U.S. by Brussel & Brussel. This was a 48-page collection of images of the Spanish bullfights.
- Lucien Clergue: Fifty Years of Photography-Vintage and Recent Works, Louis Stern Fine Arts, 2006
- Lucien Clergue: The Intimate Picasso, Louis Stern Fine Arts, 2009.
- Brasilia. Hatje Cantz, Ostfildern, Germany 2013, English language text: ISBN 978-3-7757-3313-7
- Jean Cocteau and The Testament of Orpheus. New York: Viking Studio, 2001 ISBN 0-670-89258-0
