= Robert Frank =

Swiss-American photographer (1924–2019)

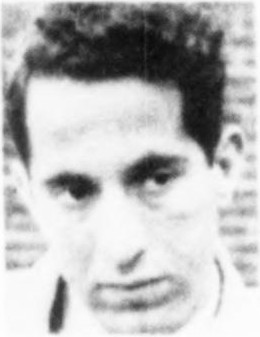
- Frank in 1953
- Born: November 9, 1924; Zürich, Switzerland
- Died: September 9, 2019 (aged 94); Inverness, Cape Breton, Nova Scotia, Canada
- Known for: Photography, film directing
- Notable work: The Americans
- Spouse(s): Mary Frank (divorced); June Leaf
- Children: 2

Robert Patrick Frank (Swiss Standard German: [fraŋk]; November 9, 1924 – September 9, 2019) was a Swiss American photographer and documentary filmmaker. His most notable work, the 1958 book titled The Americans, earned Frank comparisons to a modern-day de Tocqueville for his fresh and nuanced outsider's view of American society. Critic Sean O'Hagan, writing in The Guardian in 2014, said The Americans "changed the nature of photography, what it could say and how it could say it. [ ... ] it remains perhaps the most influential photography book of the 20th century." Frank later expanded into film and video and experimented with manipulating photographs and photomontage.

== Background and early photography career ==
Frank was born in Zürich, Switzerland, the son of Rosa (Zucker) and Hermann Frank. His family was Jewish. According to Frank, his mother, Rosa (other sources give her name as Regina), had a Swiss passport, while his father, Hermann originating from Frankfurt, Germany, had become stateless after losing his German citizenship as a Jew. They had to apply for the Swiss citizenship of Robert and his older brother, Manfred. Though Frank and his family remained safe in Switzerland during World War II, the threat of Nazism nonetheless affected his understanding of oppression. He turned to photography, in part as a means to escape the confines of his business-oriented family and home, and trained under a few photographers and graphic designers before he created his first hand-made book of photographs, 40 Fotos, in 1946. Frank emigrated to the United States in 1947, and secured a job in New York City as a fashion photographer for Harper's Bazaar.

In 1949, the new editor of Camera magazine, Walter Laubli (1902–1991), published a substantial portfolio of Jakob Tuggener pictures made at upper-class entertainments and in factories, alongside the work of the 25 year-old Frank who had just returned to his native Switzerland after two years abroad, with pages including some of his first pictures from New York. The magazine promoted the two as representatives of the 'new photography' of Switzerland.

Tuggener was a role model for the younger artist, first mentioned to him by Frank's boss and mentor, Zurich commercial photographer Michael Wolgensinger (1913–1990) who understood that Frank was unsuited to the more mercenary application of the medium. Tuggener, as a serious artist who had left the commercial world behind, was the "one Frank really did love, from among all Swiss photographers," according to Guido Magnaguagno and Fabrik, as a photo book, was a model for Frank's Les Américains (The Americans) published ten years later in Paris by Delpire, in 1958.

He soon left to travel in South America and Europe. He created another hand-made book of photographs that he shot in Peru, and returned to the U.S. in 1950. That year was momentous for Frank, who, after meeting Edward Steichen, participated in the group show 51 American Photographers at the Museum of Modern Art (MoMA); he also married fellow artist Mary Frank (née Lockspeiser), with whom he had two children, Andrea and Pablo.

Though he was initially optimistic about the United States' society and culture, Frank's perspective quickly changed as he confronted the fast pace of American life and what he saw as an overemphasis on money. He now saw America as an often bleak and lonely place, a perspective that became evident in his later photography. Frank's own dissatisfaction with the control that editors exercised over his work also undoubtedly colored his experience. He continued to travel, moving his family briefly to Paris. In 1953, he returned to New York and continued to work as a freelance photojournalist for magazines including McCall's, Vogue, and Fortune. Associating with other contemporary photographers such as Saul Leiter and Diane Arbus, he helped form what Jane Livingston has termed The New York School of photographers (not to be confused with the New York School of art) during the 1940s and 1950s.

In 1955, Frank achieved further recognition with the inclusion by Edward Steichen of seven of his photographs (many more than most other contributors) in the world-touring Museum of Modern Art exhibition The Family of Man that was to be seen by 9 million visitors and with a popular catalogue that is still in print. Frank's contributions had been taken in Spain (of a woman kissing her swaddled babe-in-arms); of a bowed old woman in Peru; a rheumy-eyed miner in Wales; and the others in England and the US, including two (one atypically soft-focus) of his wife in pregnancy; and one (later to be included in The Americans) of six laughing women in the window of the White Tower Hamburger Stand on Fourteenth Street, New York City.

== The Americans ==
Inspired by fellow Swiss Jakob Tuggener's 1943 filmic book Fabrik, Bill Brandt's The English at Home (1936), and Walker Evans's American Photographs (1938), and on the recommendation of Evans (a previous recipient), Alexey Brodovitch, Alexander Leiberman, Edward Steichen, and Meyer Schapiro, Frank secured a Guggenheim Fellowship from the John Simon Guggenheim Memorial Foundation in 1955 to travel across the United States and photograph all strata of its society. Cities he visited included Detroit and Dearborn, Michigan; Savannah, Georgia; Miami Beach and St. Petersburg, Florida; New Orleans, Louisiana; Houston, Texas; Los Angeles, California; Reno, Nevada; Salt Lake City, Utah; Butte, Montana; and Chicago, Illinois. He took his family along with him for part of his series of road trips over the next two years, during which time he took 28,000 shots. 83 of these were selected by him for publication in The Americans.

Frank's journey was not without incident. He later recalled the anti-Semitism to which he was subject in a small Arkansas town. "I remember the guy [policeman] took me into the police station, and he sat there and put his feet on the table. It came out that I was Jewish because I had a letter from the Guggenheim Foundation. They really were primitive." He was told by the sheriff, "Well, we have to get somebody who speaks Yiddish." ... "They wanted to make a thing out of it. It was the only time it happened on the trip. They put me in jail. It was scary. Nobody knew where I was." Elsewhere in the South, he was told by a sheriff that he had "an hour to leave town." Those incidents may have contributed to the dark view of America found in the work.

Shortly after returning to New York in 1957, Frank met Beat writer Jack Kerouac "at a New York party where poets and Beatniks were," and showed him the photographs from his travels. However, according to Joyce Johnson, Kerouac's lover at the time, she met Frank while waiting for Kerouac to emerge from a conference with his editors, at Viking Press, looked at Frank's portfolio, and introduced them to each other. Kerouac immediately told Frank, "Sure I can write something about these pictures." He eventually contributed the introduction to the U.S. edition of The Americans. Frank also became lifelong friends with Allen Ginsberg, and was one of the main visual artists to document the Beat subculture, which felt an affinity with Frank's interest in documenting the tensions between the optimism of the 1950s and the realities of class and racial differences. The irony that Frank found in the gloss of American culture and wealth over this tension gave his photographs a clear contrast to those of most contemporary American photojournalists, as did his use of unusual focus, low lighting and cropping that deviated from accepted photographic techniques.

This divergence from contemporary photographic standards gave Frank difficulty at first in securing an American publisher. Les Américains was first published in 1958 by Robert Delpire in Paris, as part of its Encyclopédie Essentielle series, with texts by Simone de Beauvoir, Erskine Caldwell, William Faulkner, Henry Miller and John Steinbeck that Delpire positioned opposite Frank's photographs. It was finally published in 1959 in the United States, without the texts, by Grove Press, where it initially received substantial criticism. Popular Photography, for one, derided his images as "meaningless blur, grain, muddy exposures, drunken horizons and general sloppiness." Though sales were also poor at first, the fact that the introduction was by the popular Kerouac helped it reach a larger audience. Over time and through its inspiration of later artists, The Americans became a seminal work in American photography and art history, and is the work with which Frank is most clearly identified. Critic Sean O'Hagan, writing in The Guardian in 2014, said "it is impossible to imagine photography's recent past and overwhelmingly confusing present without his lingeringly pervasive presence." and that The Americans "changed the nature of photography, what it could say and how it could say it. [ . . . ] it remains perhaps the most influential photography book of the 20th century."

In 1961, Frank received his first individual show, entitled Robert Frank: Photographer, at the Art Institute of Chicago. He also showed at the Museum of Modern Art in New York in 1962.

The French Journal Les Cahiers de la photographie devoted special issues 11 and 12 in 1983 to discussion of Robert Frank as a gesture of admiration for, and complicity with, his work, also to set forth his critical capacity as an artist.

To mark the fiftieth anniversary of the first publication of The Americans, a new edition was released worldwide on May 30, 2008. For this new edition from Steidl, most photographs are uncropped (in contrast to the cropped versions in previous editions), and two photographs are replaced with those of the same subject but from an alternate perspective.

A celebratory exhibit of The Americans, titled Looking In: Robert Frank's The Americans, was displayed in 2009 at the National Gallery of Art in Washington, D.C., the San Francisco Museum of Modern Art (SFMOMA), and at the Metropolitan Museum of Art in New York. The second section of the four-section, 2009, SFMOMA exhibition displays Frank's original application to the John Simon Guggenheim Memorial Foundation (which funded the primary work on The Americans project), along with vintage contact sheets, letters to photographer Walker Evans and author Jack Kerouac, and two early manuscript versions of Kerouac's introduction to the book. Also exhibited were three collages (made from more than 115 original rough work prints) that were assembled under Frank's supervision in 2007 and 2008, revealing his intended themes as well as his first rounds of image selection. An accompanying book, also titled Looking In: Robert Frank's The Americans, was published, the most in-depth examination of any photography book ever, at 528 pages. While working as a guard at the Metropolitan Museum of Art, Jason Eskenazi asked other noted photographers visiting the Looking In exhibition to choose their favorite image from The Americans and explain their choice, resulting in the book, By the Glow of the Jukebox: The Americans List.

== Films ==
By the time The Americans was published in the United States in 1959, Frank had moved away from photography to concentrate on filmmaking. Among his films was the 1959 Pull My Daisy, which was written and narrated by Kerouac and starred Ginsberg, Gregory Corso and others from the Beat circle. The Beats emphasized spontaneity, and the film conveyed the quality of having been thrown together or even improvised. Pull My Daisy was accordingly praised for years as an improvisational masterpiece, until Frank's co-director, Alfred Leslie, revealed in a November 28, 1968 article in the Village Voice that the film was actually carefully planned, rehearsed, and directed by him and Frank, who shot the film with professional lighting.

In 1960, Frank was staying in Pop artist George Segal's basement while filming The Sin of Jesus with a grant from Walter K. Gutman. Isaac Babel's story was transformed to center on a woman working on a chicken farm in New Jersey. It was originally supposed to be filmed in six weeks in and around New Brunswick, but Frank ended up shooting for six months.

Frank's 1972 documentary of the Rolling Stones, Cocksucker Blues, is arguably his best known film. The film shows the Stones on tour, engaging in heavy drug use and group sex. Frank said of the Stones, "It was great to watch them — the excitement. But my job was after the show. What I was photographing was a kind of boredom. It's so difficult being famous. It's a horrendous life. Everyone wants to get something from you." Mick Jagger reportedly told Frank, "It's a fucking good film, Robert, but if it shows in America we'll never be allowed in the country again." The Stones sued to prevent the film's release, and it was disputed whether Frank as the artist or the Stones as those who hired the artist owned the copyright. A court order restricted the film to being shown no more than five times per year, and only in the presence of Frank. Frank's photography also appeared on the cover of the Rolling Stones' album Exile on Main St..

Other films by Frank include Me and My Brother, Keep Busy, and Candy Mountain (the last was co-directed with Rudy Wurlitzer).

== Later life and death ==
Though Frank continued to be interested in film and video, he returned to still images in the 1970s, publishing his second photographic book, The Lines of My Hand, in 1972. This work has been described as a "visual autobiography", and consists largely of personal photographs. However, he largely gave up "straight" photography to instead create narratives out of constructed images and collages, incorporating words and multiple frames of images that were directly scratched and distorted on the negatives. None of this later work has achieved an impact comparable to that of The Americans. As some critics have pointed out, this is perhaps because Frank began playing with constructed images more than a decade after Robert Rauschenberg introduced his silkscreen composites—in contrast to The Americans, Frank's later images simply were not beyond the pale of accepted technique and practice by that time.

Frank and Mary separated in 1969. He remarried, to sculptor June Leaf, and in 1971, moved to the community of Mabou in Cape Breton Island, Nova Scotia in Canada. In 1974, his daughter, Andrea, was killed in a plane crash in Tikal, Guatemala. Also around this time, his son, Pablo, was first hospitalized and diagnosed with schizophrenia. Much of Frank's subsequent work dealt with the impact of the loss of both his daughter and subsequently his son, who died in an Allentown, Pennsylvania hospital in 1994. In 1995, in memory of his daughter he founded the Andrea Frank Foundation, which provides grants to artists.

After his move to Nova Scotia, Canada, Frank divided his time between his home there, in a former fisherman's shack on the coast, and his Bleecker Street loft in New York. He acquired a reputation for being a recluse (particularly since the death of Andrea), declining most interviews and public appearances. He continued to accept eclectic assignments, however, such as photographing the 1984 Democratic National Convention, and directing music videos for artists such as New Order ("Run"), and Patti Smith ("Summer Cannibals"). Frank produced both films and still images, and helped organize several retrospectives of his art. His work has been represented by Pace/MacGill Gallery in New York since 1984. In 1994, the National Gallery of Art in Washington, D.C. presented the most comprehensive retrospective of Frank's work to date, entitled Moving Out.

Frank died on September 9, 2019, at his home in Nova Scotia.

== Publications ==
=== Publications by Frank ===
- Les Américains = The Americans
  - Paris: Delpire, 1958. French. Includes text in French by Simone de Beauvoir, Erskine Caldwell, William Faulkner, Henry Miller and John Steinbeck about American political and social history, selected by Alain Bosquet. Part of the Encyclopédie Essentielle series.
  - New York: Grove Press, 1959. Introduction by Jack Kerouac.
  - New York: Aperture; Museum of Modern Art, 1969. Revised and enlarged edition. With an introduction by Jack Kerouac, a brief introduction by Frank, and a survey of Frank's films, each represented by a page of film frame stills.
  - Göttingen: Steidl, 2008. ISBN 978-3-86521-584-0. Most photographs are uncropped compared with cropped versions in previous editions, and two photographs are replaced with those of the same subject but from an alternate perspective.
  - New York: Aperture, 2024.
- The Lines of my Hand.
  - Tokyo: Yugensha. Deluxe, slipcased edition. Edition of 1000 copies, 500 featured the slipcase photograph of "New York City, 1948", 500 featured the slipcase photograph of "Platte River, Tennessee".
  - New York: Lustrum Press, 1972. Paperback.
  - New York: Pantheon. ISBN 9780394552552.
- Flower is… Yugensha, 1987. Edition of 1000 copies, 500 featured "Champs-Élysées, 1950 [Fleurs]" tipped onto the front cover, 500 featured "Metro Stalingrad" tipped onto the front cover.
- Flamingo. Göteborg, Sweden: Hasselblad Center, 1997. ISBN 9783931141554. Catalogue for Hasselblad Award exhibition, Hasselblad Center, Goteborg, Sweden.
- London/Wales. Published in collaboration with the Corcoran Gallery, Washington, D.C., for an exhibition held May 10 – July 14, 2003.
  - Zurich; New York: Scalo, 2003. ISBN 9783908247678.
  - Göttingen: Steidl, 2007. ISBN 978-3865213624.
- Come Again. Göttingen: Steidl, 2006. ISBN 9783865212610. According to the back cover, "Photos have been taken within the context of the photographical project 'Beirut, city centre, 1991', Éditions de Cyprès, Paris."
- Paris. Göttingen: Steidl, 2006. ISBN 978-3865215246.
- Peru. Göttingen: Steidl, 2006. ISBN 978-3865216922.
- Zero Mostel Reads a Book. Göttingen: Steidl, 2006. ISBN 978-3865215864.
- Tal Uf Tal Ab. Göttingen: Steidl, 2010. ISBN 978-3869301013. The first of the "Visual Diaries" combining photos from Frank's early career with the more private pictures he made in the latter part of his life. Other titles in the series are marked with a *
- Pangnirtung. Göttingen: Steidl, 2011. ISBN 978-3869301983.
- Pull My Daisy. Göttingen: Steidl, 2011. ISBN 978-3865216731. A transcript of Kerouac's narration from the film Pull My Daisy (1959) with film stills and an introduction by Jerry Tallmer.
- Ferne Nähe: Hommage für Robert Walser = Distant Closeness: A Tribute to Robert Walser. Bern: Robert Walser-Zentrum, 2012. ISBN 978-3-9523586-2-7.
- You Would. Göttingen: Steidl, 2012. ISBN 978-3869304182. *
- Park/Sleep. Göttingen: Steidl, 2013. ISBN 978-3869305851. *
- Partida. Göttingen: Steidl, 2014. ISBN 978-3869307954. *
- What We Have Seen. Göttingen: Steidl, 2016. ISBN 978-3958290952. *
- Leon of Juda. Göttingen: Steidl, 2017. ISBN 978-3958293113. *
- Good Days Quiet. Göttingen: Steidl, 2019. ISBN 978-3-95829-550-6.

=== Critical studies, reviews and biographies ===
- Les Cahiers de la photographie 11/12 and Special 3, “Robert Frank, la photographie, enfin,” 4th quarter, 1983; essays by Walker Evans, Gilles Mora, Alain Bergala, and others.
- Looking In: Robert Frank's The Americans. Washington, D.C.: National Gallery of Art; Göttingen: Steidl, 2009. ISBN 978-3-86521-806-3. By Sarah Greenough. With essays by Stuart Alexander, Phillip Brookman, Michel Frizot, Martin Gasser, Jeff L. Rosenheim, Lucy Sante and Anne Wilkes Tucker. Published to accompany an exhibition organised by the National Gallery of Art, Washington, D.C.
- By the Glow of the Juke Box: The Americans List. New York: Red Hook, 2012. ISBN 978-0-984195-48-0 Edited by Jason Eskenazi, with contributions from 276 photographers
- Prose, Francine (January 2010). "You got eyes: Robert Frank imagines America". Harper's. Vol. 320, no. 1916. pp. 67–73. Reviews The Americans.

== Films ==
- Don't Blink – Robert Frank (2015). Documentary directed by Laura Israel.
- Leaving Home, Coming Home: A Portrait of Robert Frank (2004). Documentary directed by Gerald Fox

== Filmography ==
List of films
Year	Name	Notes
1959	Pull My Daisy	with Alfred Leslie. Adapted from a Jack Kerouac play, starring Allen Ginsberg.
1961	The Sin of Jesus	
1963	O.K. End Here	
1965/1968	Me and My Brother	A film about Julius Orlovsky (Peter Orlovsky's brother) and his mental illness.
1969	Conversations in Vermont	
1969	Life-Raft Earth	
1971	About Me: A Musical	
1972	Cocksucker Blues	controversial film about the Rolling Stones' 1972 tour.
1975	Keep Busy	with Rudy Wurlitzer.
1980	Life Dances On	
1981	Energy and How to Get It	with Rudy Wurlitzer.
1983	This Song For Jack	
1985	Home Improvements	
1988	Candy Mountain	with Rudy Wurlitzer.
1989	Hunter	
1990	C'est vrai! (One Hour)	
1992	Last Supper	
1994	Moving Pictures	
2002	Paper Route	
2004/2008	True Story (Kurzfilm)	

== Awards ==
- 1955: Guggenheim Fellowship from the John Simon Guggenheim Memorial Foundation.
- 1996: Hasselblad Foundation International Award in Photography from the Hasselblad Foundation.
- 2002: Edward MacDowell Medal, MacDowell Colony, Peterborough, NH.
- 2015: Doctor of Fine Arts, honoris causa, Nova Scotia College of Art and Design University, Halifax, Canada.

== Sources ==
- Philip Gefter, Snapshots From The American Road, The New York Times, December 14, 2008.
