= Gabriel Bouret =

French painter (1817–1890)

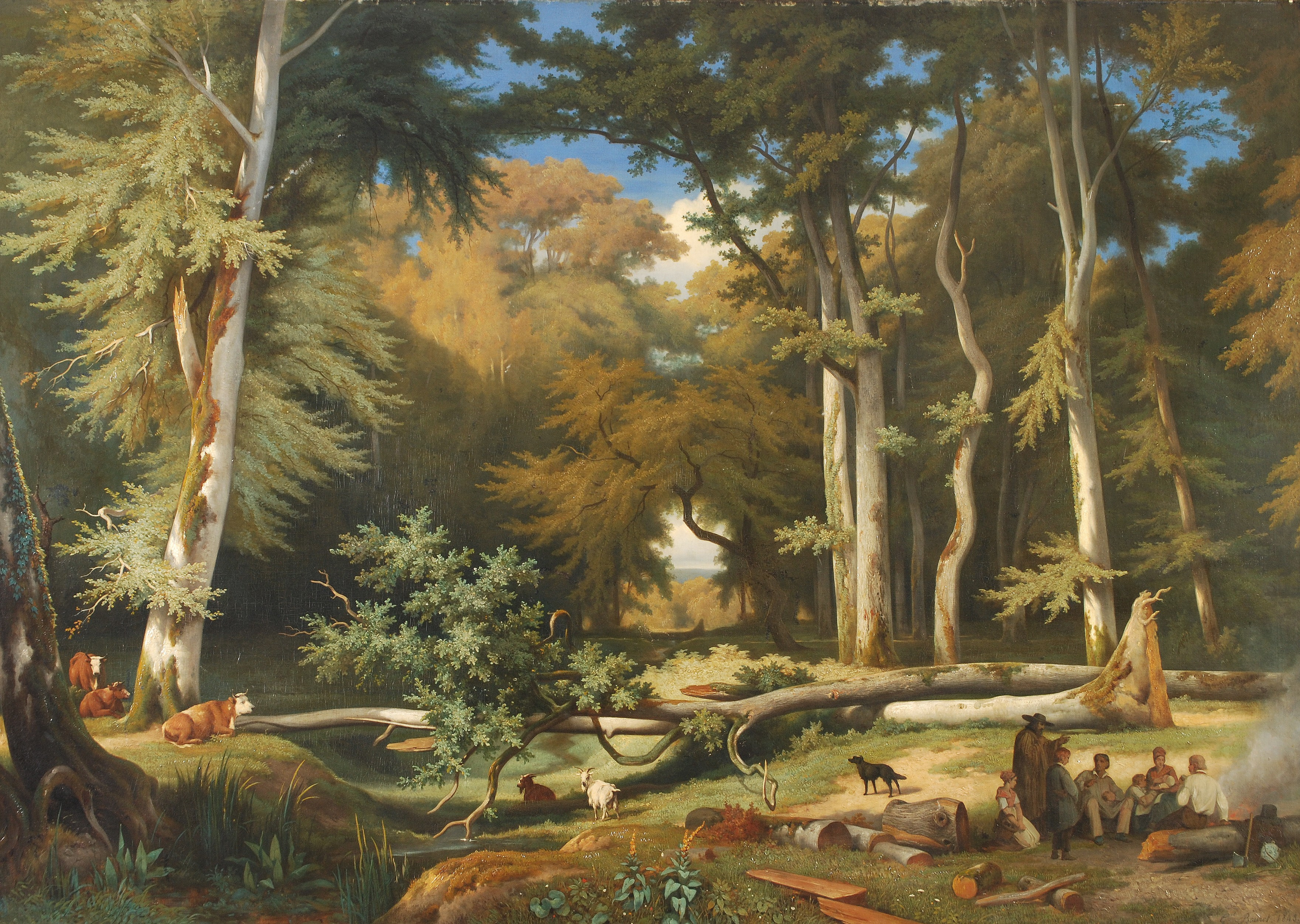
Gabriel Bouret, Figures around a camp fire in a Forest, 1843.

Gabriel Pierre Marie Bouret (French: [ɡabʁijɛl buʁɛ]; 2 March 1817 - December 1890) was a French painter born in Paris.

He apprenticed with Jean-Charles-Joseph Rémond before becoming an artist in his own right whilst studying at the Ecole des beaux Arts, Paris. He first exhibited at the Salon in 1843 with his painting, 'Vue prise aux Mares', and then again in 1868 with two paintings, 'Le retour a la ferme' and 'Une rue de Village en Normandie'. He traveled mainly in France to sketch en-plein air landscapes and forest views, in particular in the mid east of France in Poligny and near to the lake of Neuchatel. He died in Paris in December 1890.
