= Alain Desvergnes =

French photographer (1931–2020)

- Born: 9 November 1931; Dordogne, France
- Died: 12 July 2020 (aged 88); Étel, France
- Occupation: Photographer

Alain Desvergnes (9 November 1931 – 12 July 2020) was a French photographer.

== Biography ==
After studying journalism and sociology, Desvergnes left for North America in the 1960s, living in the United States and Canada. He was a lecturer at the University of Mississippi and an associate professor at the University of Ottawa, where he founded the department of visual arts. He also served as an associate professor at Saint Paul University in Ottawa in the department of social communications.

In 1979, Desvergnes returned to France. He directed the Rencontres d'Arles until 1982 when he began directing the École nationale supérieure de la photographie at the request of the Ministry of Culture. He stayed at the school for sixteen years.

A photographer, Desvergnes has displayed his works in numerous museums in Europe and North America.

Alain Desvergnes retired in Étel. He died on 12 July 2020 at the age of 88.

== Exhibitions ==
- Paysages en tant que portraits, portraits en tant que paysages (2010–12)
- Le monde de Faulkner dans le comté de Yoknapatawpha (2015)

== Publications ==
=== Photo albums ===
- Yoknapatawpha : le pays de William Faulkner (1989)
- Yoknapatawpha : the land of William Faulkner (1990)
- Paysages portraits, portraits paysages (2010)

=== Monographs ===
- L'insoupçonnable, art et manufacture remarquables en pays d'Arles (1995)
- Debbie Fleming Caffery (2001)
- Infra-mince (2005)
- Constant Puyo (2008)

== Collections ==
Many of Alain Desvergnes's works are archived in the Bibliothèque nationale de France, the Maison européenne de la photographie, the Center for the Study of Southern Culture, and the National Film Board of Canada.
