= André Rouillé =

French historian (1948–2025)

André Rouillé (21 March 1948 – 7 May 2025) was a French historian and theorist of photography. He was professor at University Paris 8, author of a significant number of books on photography and contemporary art, and founder and editor-in-chief of Paris-Art, the first French website devoted to contemporary culture.

== Life and career ==
In 1980, Rouillé (being a math professor by that time) got a doctoral degree in historical sciences in University of Franche-Comté. His research changed views of the genesis of photography. Later he wrote two books based on his thesis: L'Empire de la photographie, 1839–1870 and La Photographie en France, 1816–1871. Textes et controverses.

In 1986–1997, Rouillé was editor-in-chief of the famous La recherche photographique ("Photography Review").

In 2002, he created the Paris-Art website devoted to contemporary culture including art, photography, design, dance, and literature.

Rouillé was a professor at Université Paris 8, where he was head of the photography department and in charge of the MA program "Photography and Contemporary Art" and PhD program "Plastic arts: Photography".

Rouillé died on 7 May 2025, at the age of 77.

== Bibliography ==
- Rouillé A. (1982). L'Empire de la photographie : photographie et pouvoir bourgeois 1839–1870. Paris: Le Sycomore. p. 214.
- Rouillé A. (1986). Le Corps et son image : photographies du dix-neuvième siècle. Paris: Contrejour. p. 142.
- Rouillé A. (1986). Histoire de la photographie. Paris: Bordas. p. 286.
- Rouillé A. (1989). La Photographie en France 1816–1871, textes et controverses : une anthologie. Paris: Macula. p. 512.
- Rouillé A. (1992). Jean-Charles Langlois. La photographie, la peinture, la guerre. Correspondance inédite de Crimée. 1855–1856. Nîmes: Jacqueline Chambon. p. 312.
- Rouillé A. (1999). Nadar: correspondance 1820–1851. Nîmes: Jacqueline Chambon. p. 396.
- Rouillé A. (2005). La Photographie, entre document et art contemporain. Paris: Gallimard. p. 704.

== Sources ==
- Paris-Art website
- University Paris 8
- Department of photography at Paris 8
- Bibliography of André Rouillé
