= Bernard Plossu =

French photographer

Bernard Plossu (born 1945) is a Vietnam-born French photographer. His work is held in the collections of the Museum of Fine Arts and the Center for Creative Photography, both in Tucson, Arizona.

== Life and work ==
Plossu was born in Da Lat, Vietnam and grew up in Paris.

He traveled to Mexico for the first time in 1965 and photographed there extensively over many trips. Between 1974 and 1985, he was immersed in the American west. He moved to the USA in 1977, married an American and lived in New Mexico.

His characteristic style is the recording of encounters and feelings.

== Publications ==
=== Books by Plossu ===
- Le Voyage mexicain: 1965–1966. Contrejour, 1979. With an essay by Denis Roche. ISBN 2859490205.
  - Images En Manœuvres, 2012. ISBN 978-2849952290.
- Porquerolles, Port-Cros: Les iles. 1998.
- L'Europe Du Sud Contemporaine. 2000.
- Forget Me Not. Tf, 2002. ISBN 978-8495183774.
- Voyages Vers l'Italie = Voyages to Italy. 2005.
- Passages Par Athenes. 2006.
- Monet Intime. Filigranes, 2012. ISBN 978-2350462509.
- ¡Vámonos! Bernard Plossu in Mexico. New York: Aperture, 2014. ISBN 978-1597112765.
- The Still Hour / La hora inmóvil. Madrid: La Fabrica, 2016. ISBN 978-8416248537.
- Western Colors. London: Thames and Hudson, 2016. ISBN 978-0500544679.
- En Depliant les Montagnes. 2020.

=== Books paired with one other ===
- Col Treno. Argol, 2002. With Jean-Christophe Bailly. ISBN 978-2370690029.

== Exhibitions ==
- Musée des Beaux-Arts et d'Archéologie de Besançon, Besançon, France, 2014
- Bernard Plossu, La Fábrica, Madrid, 2015
- Bernard Plossu. Le Havre en noir et blanc, Museum of modern art André Malraux - MuMa, Le Havre, France, 2015/16

== Collections ==
- Museum of Fine Arts, Houston, TX: 11 prints (as of 23 April 2023)
- Center for Creative Photography, Tucson, Arizona
