= Albert Plécy =

French journalist, painter, photographer and filmmaker, semiotician (1914–1977)

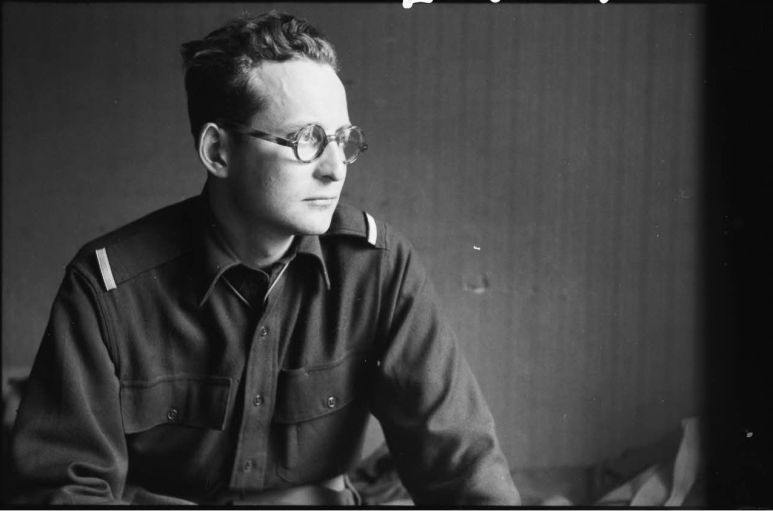
- Albert Plécy c. 1944-5
- Born: Albert Denis Frédéric Émile Plécy; 26 August 1914; Wormhout, France
- Died: 1 May 1977 (aged 62); Les Baux-de-Provence
- Occupations: journalist, photographer, painter, cinematographer, editor
- Years active: 1946-77
- Known for: establishment of department of communication and audiovisual production for la Défense (1943–1944), editor Point de vue (1946–1958), Le Parisien (1958–1977)
- Notable work: La Cathédrale d’Images, Gens d'images

Albert Plécy (26 August 1914, Wormhout – 1 May 1977, Les Baux-de-Provence) was a French journalist, painter, photographer and filmmaker, specialist in the language of the image. He was, along with Jacques Henri Lartigue and Raymond Grosset, one of the three emblematic founders of the association of Gens d'images.

== Biography ==
Albert Plécy was born on 26 August 1914 in Wormhout to mother, Marcelle (née Dehaene 1887–1981) and Frédéric Plécy, corporal in the 8th Territorial Infantry Regiment, killed 18 October 1916 in Péramy during the Meuse–Argonne offensive when Albert was two and his elder brother four.

During the Second World War, he was a second lieutenant, seconded in 1943 to the French expeditionary force, and at the request of General Alphonse Juin, he became the head of the Army Cinema Service (SCA) in the theatre of foreign operations in Tunisia, Corsica and during the Italian campaign (1943–1944), when he was wounded. He worked as a photographer, in collaboration with ciné cameraman Raymond Méjat, and was editor of the newspaper of the combatants of the African Army.

Upon Liberation he was on a team of the French Foreign Legion who founded Point de vue, a publication of which he became editor-in-chief in 1946 then of Parisien libéré. Within Point de vue-Images du monde, from 1953 to 1977 he hosted the “Permanent Photo Show” in which he paid tribute to photographers and illustrators.

Albert Plécy committed suicide by shooting himself on 1 May 1977 (aged 62) in Baux-de-Provence.

=== Gens d'images ===
Plécy and Paul Almásy created Gens d'images on 15 October 1954, then the Niépce Prize in 1955, then the Nadar Prize.

=== "Chambre Noire" ===
From 1964 to 1968, Plécy hosted, with Michel Tournier, a television program "Chambre noire", while continuing his activity as a journalist. For each episode a photographer was interviewed on their imagery; the series featured, amongst others, Maurice Baquet, Robert Doisneau, Bill Brandt, Brassaï, Denis Brihat, Édouard Boubat, Izis...

=== Les Journées internationales de photojournalisme ===
In 1959, he launched with Raymond Grosset and in conjunction with the association "People and Culture", Les Journées internationales de photojournalisme ('International Photojournalism Days') at the University Centre of Saint-Exupéry in Boulouris. Amongst the participants were Jean Dieuzaide, Pierre Gassmann, and Jacques Henri Lartigue.

In 1960, the Journées took place again in Boulouris; in 1961 in San Pellegrino; then from 1962 in Porquerolles, at the Mas du Langoustier. In 1974, the 14th and last Journées were held at Fort St. Agathe.

=== New aesthetics ===
In 1963, he created Esthétiques nouvelles, an image consulting firm.

=== La Cathédrale d’Images ===
Plécy established the 'Cathedral of Images' in the white limestone quarries of Les Baux-de-Provence, in 1975; it was a novel and, for the time, advanced production of luminous frescoes of automatically changing imagery on the white stone walls from dozens of carousel projectors, with accompanying soundtrack, that enveloped the contours of the walls and the ceiling of the quarry, producing a 3-dimensional vision, with actors, and the viewers themselves, being illuminated and integrated into the vividly coloured imagery. It attracted international visitors.

After Plécy died, on 1 May 1977, his second wife, Anne (née Carlier) continued her husband's work until her own death in 2002. The Baux de Provence municipal council, wishing to manage the (necessarily irregular) show themselves, terminated the lease and privatised it. After its closure on 21 September 2010 at the initiative of the municipality, it was renamed Carrières de Lumières in 2012, formalised on 19 January 2018 against the illegal termination of the original commercial lease. The current manifestation is an expanded, digitised production. The conception of the audiovisual show “cathedral of images” is discussed in Plécy's book Hommes d'Images (Actes Sud 1997).

== Bibliography ==
- The elementary grammar of the image, Paris, École Estienne, 1968 (1st ed. 1962).
- The photo, art and language: The elementary grammar of the image, Paris, Marabout, 1975 (1st ed. 1971) (revised edition of La grammaire élémentaire de l'image).
- Albert Plécy, Hommes d'images, Actes Sud, 1997
- Gérard Blanchard and Jean-Claude Macquet, 'Hommage à Albert Plécy', Communication et languages, vol. 34, no 1, 1977, p. 122
- Claude Renaud, "Testimony of Claude Renaud on Albert Plécy, founder of Gens d´images", in "L'Histoire", Les Gens images, 2014.
