= Caujolle =

Caujolle is a French surname. Notable people with the surname include:

- Christian Caujolle (1953–2025), French journalist, photo agent, curator and photographer
- Jean-François Caujolle (born 1953), French tennis player
