= Niépce Prize =

Photography award in France

The Niépce Prize has been awarded annually since 1955 to a professional photographer who has lived and worked in France for over 3 years and is younger than 50 years (previously 45 years) of age. It was introduced in honour of Joseph Nicéphore Niépce by Albert Plécy and Paul Almásy for the l'Association Gens d'Images.

== History ==
The Prix Niépce Gens d'images "rewards each year the work of a professional photographer residing in France for more than three years, and aged under 50 at most on January 1 of the year for which he competes. It is supported by the Ministry of Culture and by the National Library of France, a historical institutional partner which hosts the deliberations and the proclamation of the prize.

From 2011 to 2015, it is financially endowed by the film company MK2, directed by Marin Karmitz. Since 2016, it is endowed by the Picto Foundation, the endowment fund of the Picto laboratories which rewards the winner, designs and produces with The Eyes Publishing an artist's book. Since 2019, it has also benefited from the patronage of ADAGP, Society of authors in the graphic and plastic arts.

== List of winners ==
- 1954: Jean Dieuzaide
- 1956: Robert Doisneau
- 1957: Denis Brihat
- 1958: René Basset
- 1959: Jeanloup Sieff
- 1960: Léon Herschtritt
- 1961: Jean-Dominique Lajoux
- 1962: Jean-Louis Swiners
- 1963: Gilles Ehrmann
- 1964: Jean Garet
- 1965: Thierry Davoust
- 1966: Marc Garanger and Rudolf Lichtsteiner
- 1967: Pierre and Dorine Berdoy
- 1968: Claude Sauvageot
- 1969: Jean-Pierre Ducatez
- 1970: Serge Chirol and Claude-Raimond Dityvon
- 1971: Jean-Luc Tartarin
- 1972: Pierre Le Gall and Guillaume Lieury
- 1973: Albert Visage
- 1974: Pierre Michaud
- 1975: Jean-Louis Nou
- 1976: Eddie Kuligowski, Claude Nuridsany and Marie Pérennou
- 1977: Roland Laboye
- 1978: Alain Chartier
- 1979: Françoise Saur
- 1980: Gilles Kervella
- 1981: Frédéric Brenner and Jacques Bondon
- 1982: Not awarded
- 1983: Pascal Dolémieux
- 1984: Thierry Girard
- 1985: Hervé Rabot
- 1986: Jean-Marc Zaorski
- 1987: Agnès Bonnot
- 1988: Keiichi Tahara
- 1989: Gladys and Patrick Zachmann
- 1990: Hugues de Wurstemberger
- 1991: Jean-Louis Courtinat
- 1992: Luc Choquer
- 1993: Jean-Claude Coutausse
- 1994: Xavier Lambours
- 1995: Marie-Paule Nègre
- 1996: Lise Sarfati
- 1997: Patrick Tosani
- 1998: Florence Chevallier
- 1999: Philippe Bazin
- 2000: Klavdij Sluban
- 2001: Antoine D'Agata
- 2002: Luc Delahaye
- 2003: Stéphane Couturier
- 2004: Claudine Doury
- 2005: Elina Brotherus
- 2006: Onodera Yuki
- 2007: Bertrand Meunier
- 2008: Jürgen Nefzger
- 2009: Stéphanie Lacombe
- 2010: Jean-Christian Bourcart
- 2011: Guillaume Herbaut
- 2012: Denis Darzacq
- 2013: Valérie Jouve
- 2014: Mathieu Pernot
- 2015: Laurent Millet
- 2016: Laurence Leblanc
- 2017: Olivier Culmann
- 2018: Stéphane Lavoué
- 2019: Raphaël Dallaporta
- 2020: Marina Gadonneix
- 2021: Grégoire Eloy
- 2022: Julien Magre
- 2023: Juliette Agnel
- 2024: Anne-Lise Broyer
- 2025: Ed Alcock
- 2026: Alexandra Catiere
