= Le château d'eau, pôle photographique de Toulouse =

Photography gallery in historic building in Toulouse, France

Coordinates: 43°35′55″N 1°26′12″E

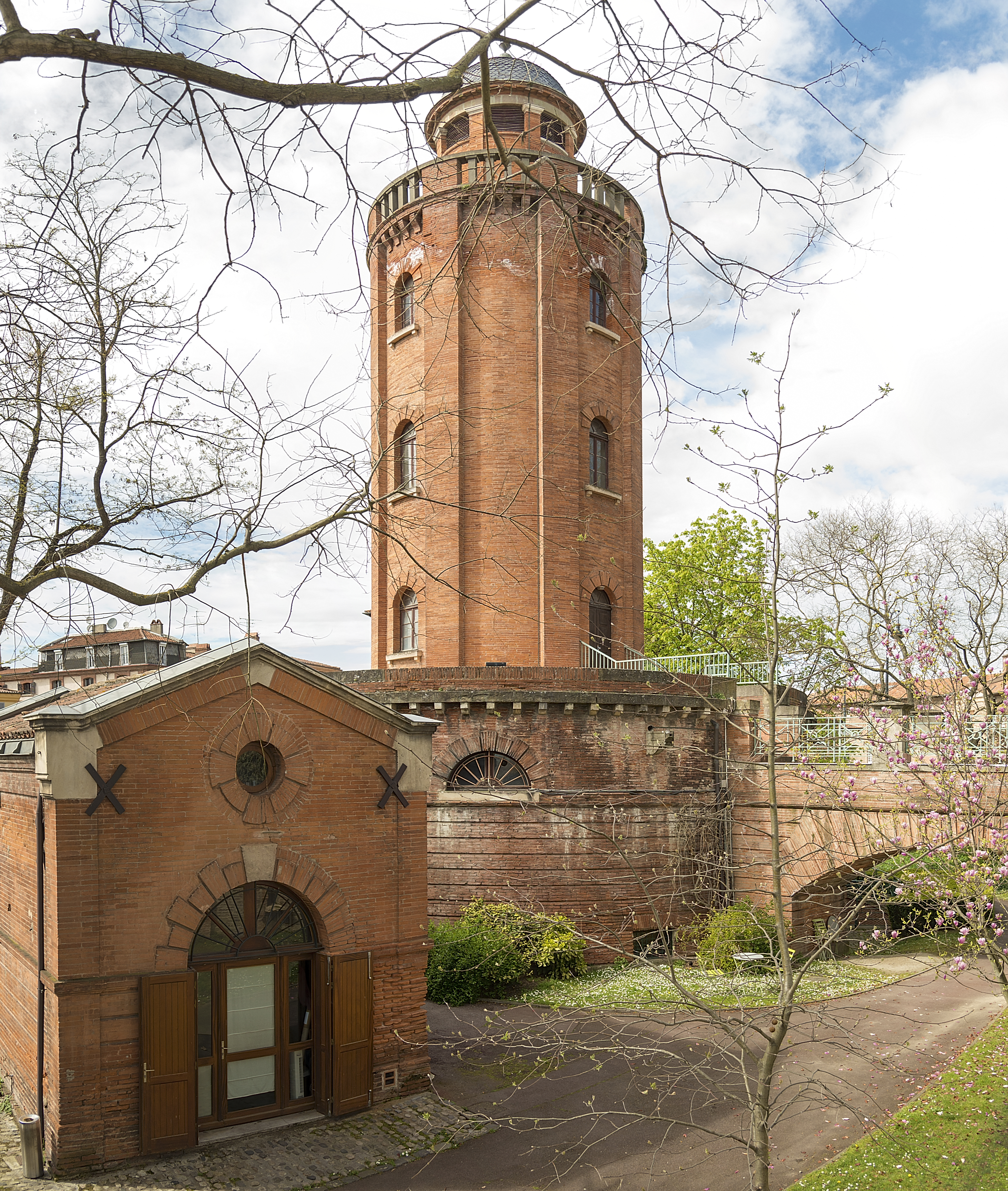
Château d'eau Laganne

The Château d'Eau is a nineteenth century water tower, near the cours Dillon, beside the Pont-Neuf, in Toulouse, France. The building and its pumping station have been listed as historical monuments since 28 September 1987.

Le château d'eau, pôle photographique de Toulouse, also called Galerie du Château d'Eau, is a cultural institution dedicated to photography, founded in 1974 in Toulouse by the photographer Jean Dieuzaide.

== History ==
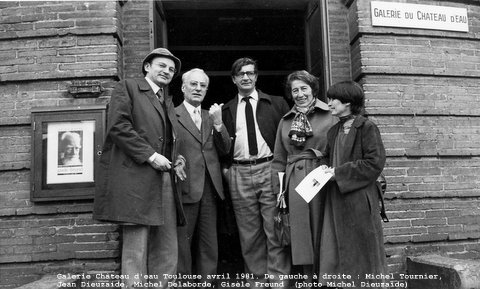
From left to right: Michel Tournier, Jean Dieuzaide, Michel Delaborde, Gisèle Freund and Chantal Dieuzaide (April 1981 ).

Constructed in 1825, the Water Tower was a pumping station until it was saved from demolition to be converted into a gallery dedicated to photography in April 1974, thanks to the efforts of Jean Dieuzaide, the originator of the project, and with the help of the photography association, the "Cercle des XII", in which the idea evolved.

As remarked by Dieuzaide in 1992, in 1855 the "Société Française de Photographie" was formed in Paris, and The Royal Society of Photography in London in 1857 and then in Toulouse in 1875 the "Société Photographique de Toulouse" was founded with 150 members. In 1895, while still within the Society, a group formed the "Photo Club Toulousain" with 300 members. In May 1937, dissatisfied by the academic routine of the "Photo Club", Doctor Laurentie and Bernard Saltel broke away from it, desiring freedom to take "another photograph"; the "Cercle des XII" was founded and became the institution whose evolution, 37 years later, formed the principle of the Château d'Eau. The restriction to a "Cercle des XII" of only twelve members was a means of excluding the indifferent and enforcing regionality: members must not exceed the number of pommels bordering the cross of the Comtes de Toulouse.

The group abandoned Pictorialism in search for a more authentic image, banishing the imitation of painting. Theoretical and technical discussion was excluded to concentrate on the actual photography. In 1939 the war intervened and the "Cercle des XII" was only revived after the Liberation in 1946 with the addition of a few new members. The prosperous years of the 50s, 60s and 70s saw the Cercle breaking out of the routine of competitions by organising themed exhibitions at the Palais des Beaux-Arts in Toulouse bringing photography in 1961 and for the first time in France, into "the Museum" to present exhibitions with very large images of one to three square meters, hung in the Renaissance cloister of the Musée des Augustins. At one of these events, in 1971, Professor Ourliac, responsible for Culture, accepted the principle of creating a photographic department at the Château d'Eau, in parallel with the painters' organisation "Les Méridionaux" formed in 1981 and in which the "Cercle des XII" had exhibited.

Thus the Chateau d'Eau is historically the first public gallery exclusively intended for the exhibition of photographs and the second public institution devoted to photography in general, after the Musée Nicéphore-Niépce, founded two years earlier. Originally, only the ground floor was used as an exhibition space, before, in 1984, the basement was converted into an additional exhibition space.

== PACE ==
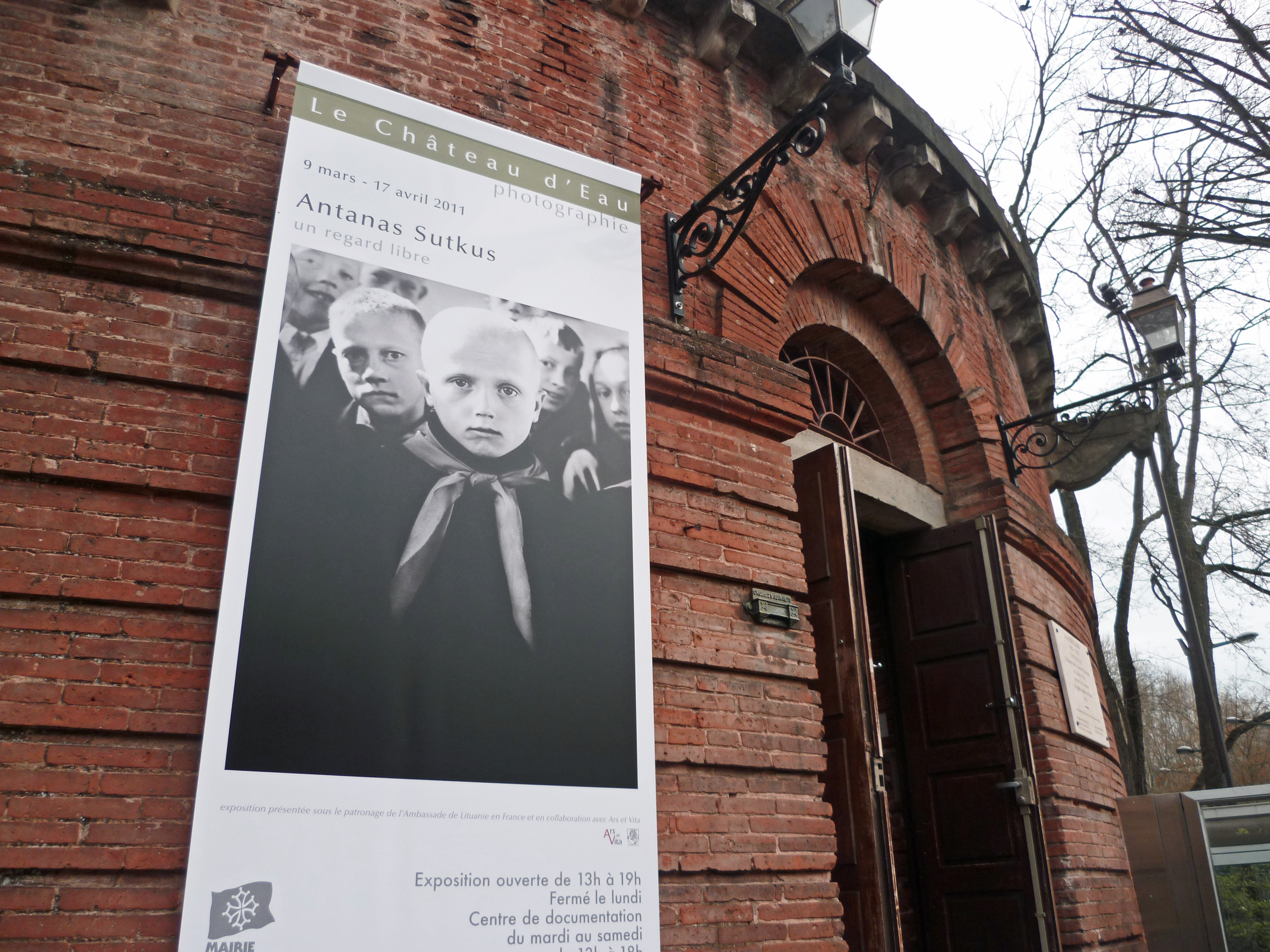
Exhibition Antanas Sutkus in 2011.

In 1986 the management of the gallery was assigned to the PACE association (Photography at the Château d'Eau), created in 1981, then in 1990, an archive and a second gallery were set up respectively under the arches of the Pont-Neuf and under one of the old access ramps to the bridge.

Into the 2000s and 2010s, the archive had a library of over 13,500 books specialising in photography, including rare books and also a collection of DVDs, VHS videos, 35mm slides, as well as a wide variety of national and international magazines to which it subscribes. The Château d'Eau gallery also has a permanent collection of approximately 5400 photographs, from which material for an average of a dozen educational or traveling exhibitions per year is loaned

Apart from its participation in the local contemporary art festival of the 'Printemps de Septembre', the gallery of the Château d'Eau in principle ran an annual program of six seasons, with a maximum of ten exhibitions, presented as two concurrent exhibitions; an established artist in the main space, and an emerging artist in the second gallery. During major monographic exhibitions, both spaces are visited by about 30,000 people per year. Monographs (more than 330 at the end of 2011), works in co-editions with major publishers and posters are produced for such events.

Starting in 1974 with an exhibition devoted to Robert Doisneau, the works of the greatest international photographers have been presented and the venue is one of the most important devoted to photography in France, and one of the rare national photographic institutions benefiting from an international reputation.

== Directors ==
Three directors succeeded each other from April 1974 to the end of December 2019 at the head of the Château d'eau:

- Jean Dieuzaide, from April 1974 to September 1995;
- Michel Dieuzaide, his son, from October 1995 to September 2001;
- Jean-Marc Lacabe, from |October 2001 to December 2019

== Controversy ==
From January 2020, due to historically stormy relations between town hall, the association and management, already deplored by Jean Dieuzaide himself, the Gallery of the Château d'Eau was subsumed under the governance of the town hall of Toulouse, instead of the PACE association which had charge of the venue for 33 years.

The municipality's ambition was expansion and (necessary) renovation of the buildings, but also to arrange for better management of this institution and the fulfilment of long-standing promises made by Jean-Luc Moudenc to the Dieuzaide's heirs for the preservation and enhancement of the Dieuzaide fund, acquired after long negotiations by the municipality. After several announcements over more than a decade for the creation of a dedicated place, the town hall finally charges the Toulouse Municipal Archives and the Château d'Eau to respectively conserve, enhance and bring this fund to life.

On 16 November 16, 2020, Christian Caujolle, was appointed artistic advisor to the Château d'Eau

On 1 February 2021, and following long disputes between Moudenc and the board of directors of PACE regarding the Château d'Eau collection – 5400 prints of photographs (including 2200 signed originals) and approximately 13,500 books – the administrative court of Toulouse decides and confirms the PACE association as the sole owner. In reaction to this decision, the Town Hall announces that it wants to refer to the Court of Cassation and the association publicly mentions the possibility of moving to Mazamet if the conflict cannot be resolved.
