= Paul Almásy =

French/Hungarianphotojournalist (1906–2003)

- Almásy Pál
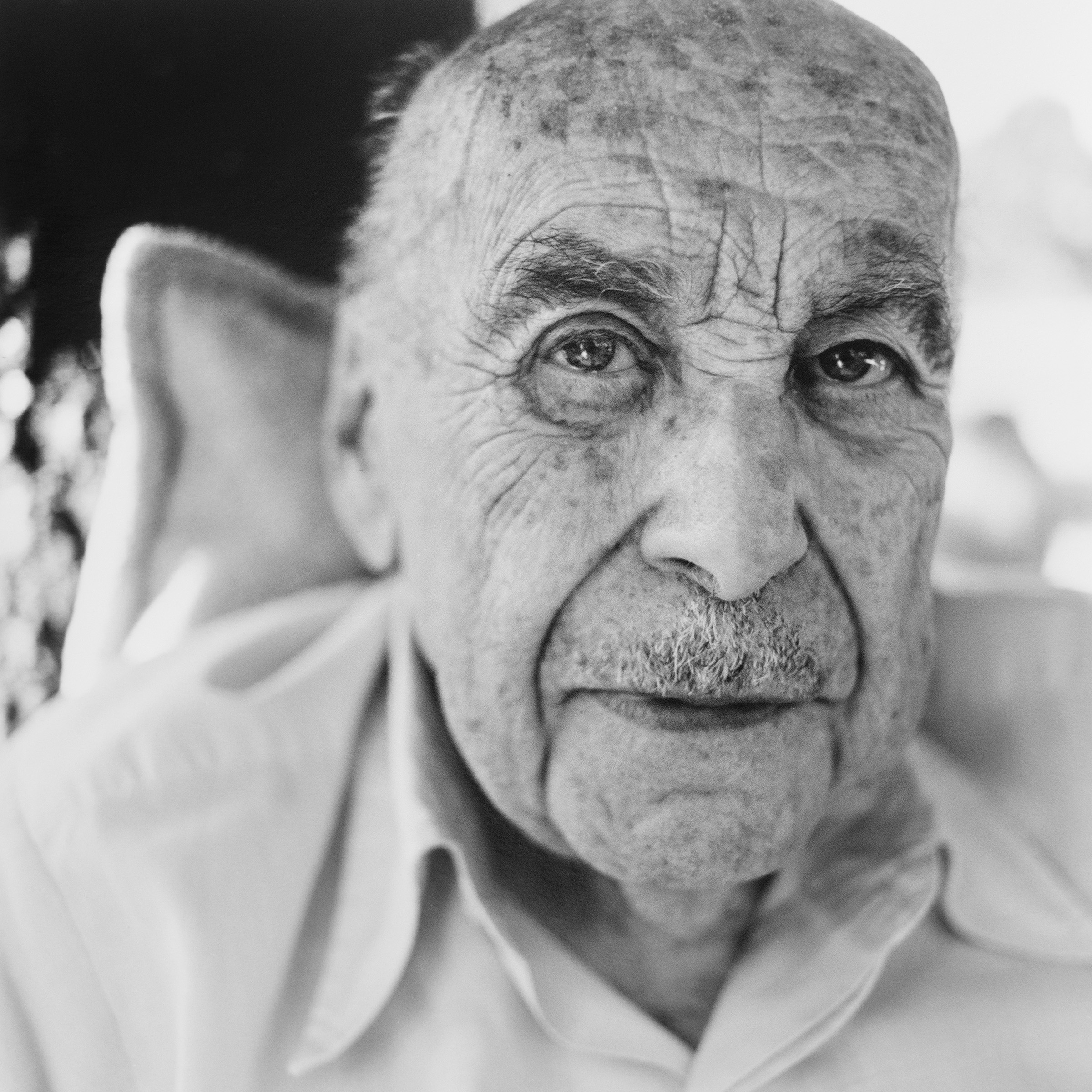
- Paul Almásy photographed by Oliver Mark, Paris 2000
- Born: Paul Gross Almásy; 29 May 1906; Budapest, Austria-Hungary Empire
- Died: 23 September 2003 (aged 97); Jouars-Pontchartrain, France
- Citizenship: Hungarian (1906–1956); French (1956–2003)
- Occupations: Photographer; Journalist

Paul Almásy (29 May 1906 in Budapest – 23 September 2003 in Jouars-Pontchartrain) was a Hungarian-born Swiss photographer known for his documentary and portrait photography. He grew up in a family of artists and turned to photography in the 1930s.

Almásy worked as a photojournalist for various newspapers and magazines in Europe, covering events such as the Spanish Civil War and World War II. He was also known for his portraits of famous artists, writers, and intellectuals, including Pablo Picasso, Salvador Dali, Jean-Paul Sartre, and Albert Camus.

In the 1950s, Almásy moved to Switzerland and became a Swiss citizen. He continued to work as a photographer, often focusing on landscapes and travel photography. His work has been exhibited in galleries and museums around the world, and he is considered one of the most important photographers of the 20th century.

== Early life ==
Paul Gross Almásy was born on 29 May 1906 in Budapest and grew up there. He was the youngest of five children in a family of artists; his father was a painter and his mother was a writer. At 17, he left Hungary and studied political science in Vienna, Munich and Heidelberg in 1924 to prepare for a diplomatic career but was drawn to journalism.

== Career ==
In 1925, he accepted a job as a correspondent in Morocco during the Republic of the Rif. Almásy then became a photojournalist and, from 1929 to 1931, wrote his first reports from Rome for the German press agency Wehr illustrated with his photographic work.

To illustrate his articles, he took the first photographs in 1935 during a trip to South America. In the years that followed, countless reports from all parts of the world followed; for example, in 1936, for the Berliner Illustrirte Zeitung, he crossed the Sahara by car. He undertook several trips to Africa in the late 1930s and Illustrierte on the training of Finnish athletes for the 1936 Summer Olympics. During the Second World War, he covered events from France, Belgium and the Netherlands for the Swiss press between 1940 and 1943.

After the war, Paris became the focus of his life while travelling; for example, in 1950, he travelled to Indochina. From 1952 Almásy worked on behalf of United Nations institutions such as UNICEF, World Health Organization and UNESCO, for which he traveled as an accredited employee. His graphic reports on the racial problem in South Africa in 1953, the drug problem in Asia, the life of the Eskimos and on Tierra del Fuego in 1962 which made him one of the most traveled photojournalists.

He was a founding member along with Albert Plécy of the photographic group Gens d'Images that annually promotes the Niépce Prize and Prix Nadar. In 1956, Almásy took French citizenship. From 1972 to 1989, he held professorships in Paris at the Sorbonne University and at the Center de Perfectionnement des Journalistes.

In 1963, Argentina issued a postage stamp for the fight against hunger featuring one of his photographs, and in 1965, he published "Le monde a thirst", a report on the lack of water in the world. In 1995, Paul Almásy sold his color photographs to Branded Entertainment Network (Corbis), the image bank founded by Bill Gates.

== Work ==
Almásy's subjects were people from all walks of life: "People like you and me", but also ethnic and social fringe groups, people from the upper and lower classes. Whether taken in a severe or bleak, documentary, cheerful or even funny context, the people in his pictures always retain their dignity. In his volume "Paris", one senses an endearing approach to portraying life on the street or the world of artists; his style is sometimes reminiscent of André Kertész and resembles the paintings of Robert Doisneau in his witty and mischievous observations on the fringes of world history. Almásy also associated with the nobility and bohemian society and documented their festivals and rituals. He was personally known to Otto von Habsburg and Baron Rothschild. Over the decades, he made interviews and reports with important people of contemporary history such as Menachem Begin, Nikita Khrushchev, Dwight D. Eisenhower, Charles de Gaulle, Benito Mussolini, Jawaharlal Nehru and the Shah of Persia Mohammad Reza Pahlavi. Almásy has taken remarkable portraits of many other personalities from public life, which have entered the collective memory - artists of various provenance are to be mentioned here as examples: Salvador Dalí, Alberto Giacometti, André Breton, Colette, Jean Cocteau, Jacques Prévert, Man Ray, Romy Schneider and Alain Delon and Yves Saint Laurent.

He is often considered an "onlooker of world history", working on an "archive of the world". His work featured largely turbulent historical periods from 1930s to the late 1960s in various locations, representing a broad spectrum of the human condition. According to his own statement, he had worked in every country in the world "except Mongolia". Almásy characterizes his way of working as it always being “chance that decided everything. I never searched – my camera was the viewfinder, I was just the finder.” Although not his primary aim, many of his images are characterized by authenticity and simple beauty, revealing a discreetly observing humanist behind the camera.

After his time as a reporter, his work was only known to specialists for a long time. The processing of his archive, which contains 120,000 negatives, is in the hands of akg-images and is far from over; what has been published in recent years shows, however, that the task here is to snatch the work of a significant figure in the history of photography from oblivion. In this context, in addition to more recent book publications, there was also an extensive exhibition in the Frankfurt Museum of Modern Art around the turn of the millennium, which was followed by others in Munich's Haus der Kunst and also in Budapest. In the spring of 2006, parts of his early work were in the Art and Culture Foundation Opel Villas Rüsselsheim in Rüsselsheim am Main.

== Death ==
23 September 2003, Almásy died at the age of 97 on his estate in Jouars-Pontchartrain near Paris. His estate contains around 120,000 negatives.

== Awards and honours ==
In 1993, Almásy was made a knight of the Ordre national du Mérite.
