= Miho Kajioka =

Japanese photographer

Miho Kajioka (born 21 February 1973) is a Japanese photographer based in Kyoto. She is known for minimalist black-and-white photography influenced by Japanese aesthetics and concepts of time, memory, and impermanence. In 2019 she received the Prix Nadar for her photobook So it goes.

== Early life and education ==
Kajioka was born in Okayama, Japan, in 1973. She moved to the United States in 1992 to study painting at the San Francisco Art Institute, later shifting her focus to photography. She continued her studies at Concordia University in Montreal, Canada.

After graduating, Kajioka returned to Japan and worked in Tokyo producing news and documentary programs for Brazilian television. Covering events such as the 2011 Tōhoku earthquake and tsunami and the Fukushima nuclear disaster significantly influenced her artistic outlook, prompting her return to photographic practice as a means of reflecting on fragility, continuity, and daily life.

== Career ==
Kajioka's work gained wider attention in the late 2010s through exhibitions and artist books. Her photographs were exhibited at Paris Photo, where her book So it goes received the Prix Nadar in 2019. She has held solo exhibitions including Tanzaku at The Photographers' Gallery in London and Do you open your eyes in the sea? at Polka Galerie in Paris, presented during Paris Photo.

She has also participated in workshops and international residencies, including a residency at the Cité Internationale des Arts in Paris, where she developed new work informed by travel and observational practice.

== Work and styles ==
Kajioka creates minimalist photographic work that draws on the Japanese tradition of wabi-sabi—the appreciation of imperfection and transience—as well as Zen and Taoist ideas that emphasize space and absence.

Her practice often begins with intuitive observations of everyday fragments—such as shadows, birds, or children—followed by a process of reduction in the darkroom. She frequently produces silver gelatin prints and stains them with tea, a traditional Japanese technique that softens the surface and introduces organic tonal variation.

Kajioka's sequencing and book design are central to her work. So it goes uses transparent paper and layered imagery to create juxtapositions that explore memory, place, and non-linear time, influenced in part by Kurt Vonnegut's novel Slaughterhouse-Five and its recurring phrase "so it goes."

Her work emphasizes negative space and minimal composition, departing from conventional frame-filling photography and allowing viewers to interpret meaning through visual quietness and restraint.

== Publications ==
- And, where did the peacocks go?. Paris: Them, 2018.
- So it goes. Paris: Them / Antwerp: Ibasho, 2019. Edition of 540 copies.
  - Second edition. So It Goes, So It Goes. Paris: Them / Ibasho, 2020. ISBN 979-1095424222. Smaller, with a different cover, and new images.
  - Third edition. So it goes, so it goes, so it goes. Paris: Them / Antwerp: Ibasho, 2023. With a different cover and additional images.
- Flowers Bloom, Butterflies Come. France: Iikki, 2021. Edition of 750 copies.
- And, do you still hear the peacocks?. Paris: Them / Antwerp: Ibasho, 2022.

== Awards ==
- 2019 – Prix Nadar for So it goes
