= Claudine Doury =

French photographer

Claudine Doury (born 1959) is a French photographer living in Paris. She has been a member of Agence Vu since 1991. In 1999, she received the Leica Oskar Barnack award as well as a World Press Photo award for her work on the "Peoples of Siberia", and the Niépce Prize in 2004. Her Siberian work has been shown in a solo exhibition at the Académie des Beaux-Arts in Paris.

== Life and work ==
Doury was born in 1959 in Blois, France.

Her work deals with the notions of memory, transition and passage, particularly around adolescence and travel, central themes in her work.

In 2017, she received the Prix Marc Ladreit de Lacharrière – Académie des beaux-arts, to carry out her project A Siberian Odyssey in 2018—published in 2020 as Amour—the story of a quest conducted for almost thirty years in this region of the world.

In 2006, she exhibited Beyond the Steppes at Rencontres d'Arles.

Doury has been a member of Agence Vu since 1991.

== Publications ==
=== Publications by Doury ===
- Peuples de Sibérie: Du fleuve Amour aux terres boréales. Seuil, 1999. ISBN 978-2020372251. With a preface by Christian Caujolle and an essay by Jean-Pierre Thibaudat.
- Artek, un été en Crimée. La Martinière, 2004. ISBN 978-2732431215. With a preface by Christian Caujolle.
- Loulan Beauty. Chêne, 2007. ISBN 978-2842777401.
- Sasha. Caillou Bleu, 2011. ISBN 978-2930537115. With essays by Christian Caujolle and Melanie McWhorter.
- L'homme nouveau. Filigranes, 2017 ISBN 978-2-35046-400-8.
- Amour. Chose Commune, 2020. ISBN 979-10-96383-15-3.

=== Publications with contributions by Doury ===
- Regards sur le Monde: les Visages de la Faim. Acropole Belfont, 2004. ISBN 2735702545.
- Misère Urbaine: La Faim Cachée. Au Diable Vauvert, 2006. ISBN 978-2846261128.

== Awards ==
- 1999: Leica Oskar Barnack award
- 1999: World Press Photo 2000
- 2004: Niépce Prize, for Artek, un été en Crimée

== Solo exhibitions ==
- Une odyssée sibérienne = A Siberian Odyssey, Académie des Beaux-Arts, Paris, 2018
