= Eddie Kuligowski =

French photographer (1946–2021)

- Born: 22 July 1946; Montargis, France
- Died: 15 January 2021 (aged 74)
- Occupation: Photographer

Edouard "Eddie" Kuligowski (22 July 1946 – 15 January 2021) was a French photographer who won the Niépce Prize, the most prestigious prize for a photographer in France.

== Biography ==
Kuligowski was born in 1946 in Montargis, France into a working-class family of Polish descent.

Kuligowski studied in an advertising photography studio before joining the agency Viva, then VLOO. Starting in 1973, his black and white photographs were published several times a year such as Camera International and Zoom. They were exhibited internationally.

In 1976, Kuligowski won the Niépce Prize. In the 1980s and '90s, he took fashion and advertising photographs, which were published in magazines such as Harper's Bazaar. In 2000, he began teaching photography courses and training interns.

Eddie Kuligowski died on 15 January 2021 at the age of 74. His wife Susan died four days later.

== Collections ==
- Bibliothèque nationale de France
- Centre Pompidou
- Musée Nicéphore-Niépce
- Musée Réatu
- Musée Cantini

== Publications ==
- Transmigration (1977)
- Livre premier (1992)
- Rochefort et la Corderie Royale (1995)
- Paris Romance (2000)
- Parisienne(s) (2001)
- Paroles de femmes, la liberté du regard (2007)
- La photographie en France, des origines à nos jours (2008)
