= Elina Brotherus =

Finnish photographer and video artist

- Born: 29 April 1972 (age 54); Helsinki

Elina Brotherus (born 29 April 1972) is a Finnish photographer and video artist specializing in self-portraits and landscapes. She lives and works in Helsinki, Finland and Avallon, France.

Brotherus' work blends personal and art-historical perspectives. Many of her photographs and videos are self-portraits that explore the connection between individuals and their environment, both in terms of interior spaces and landscapes.

In her exhibition The Avantgarde doesn’t give up, Brotherus engaged with and reinterpreted a series of written instructions from the avant-garde and neo-avant-garde movements. These instructions included performance scripts, Fluxus works, phrases from books, and titles of artworks. By embracing the avant-garde’s legacy, Brotherus carries its spirit into the contemporary era, creating a body of work that both honors and reshapes these artistic movements.

Brotherus holds a Master’s degree in Photography from the University of Art and Design Helsinki (now Aalto University) and a Master of Science in Chemistry from the University of Helsinki. She has showcased her work in prominent solo exhibitions globally, including at Centre Pompidou in Paris, The National Art Center in Tokyo, Kunst Haus Wien in Vienna, and Weserburg Museum für Moderne Kunst in Bremen. Her works are also featured in major collections, such as those of the Louisiana Museum of Modern Art in Humlebæk, MAXXI in Rome, and Moderna Museet in Stockholm.

== Life ==
Brotherus was born in Helsinki. She earned an M.S. in analytical chemistry from the University of Helsinki in 1997 and an M.F.A. in photography from the University of Art and Design Helsinki in 2000. She is considered a prominent member of The Helsinki School. In 2003, her work was exhibited by the Orange County Museum of Art in Girls’ Night Out. She won a scholarship from the Carnegie Art Award in 2004 and she won the Niépce Prize in 2005. She is proud of being able to produce images taken from nature that are not "photoshopped". Her work is primarily autobiographical. She documents her infertility and "involuntary childlessness" in her 2011–2015 series "Carpe Fucking Diem" and 2009-2013 "Annonciation."

== Awards ==
- Niépce Prize 2005
- Carnegie Art Award 2004
- Citigroup Private Bank Photography Prize 2002
- Fotofinlandia 2000 award for photography.
