= René Basset (photographer) =

French photographer (1919–2021)

- Born: 7 October 1919; Lyon, France
- Died: 12 October 2021 (aged 102)
- Occupation: Photographer

René Basset (7 October 1919 – 12 October 2021) was a French photographer. He received the Niépce Prize in 1958.

== Biography ==
Basset's became a photographer in 1932 and created a studio in Lyon in 1949. He was a founding member of the groups Forme et Lumière and Forum. He was the oldest surviving recipient of the Niépce Prize.

René Basset died on 12 October 2021 at the age of 102.

== Exhibitions ==
- Rétrospective (1994, Lyon)
- Transparences (2000, La Ricamarie)
- Photogravure, la photo comme estampe (2000, Villeurbanne)
- Figures (2001, Francheville)
- Lyon Nostalgie (2013, Saint-Cyr-au-Mont-d'Or)

== Bibliography ==
- Verneret, Gilles (2009). Lyon des photographes: publié à l'occasion de l'exposition organisée au musée des Moulages de Lyon, du 3 au 28 novembre 2009, pour les 10 ans de la galerie "Le Bleu du ciel (in French). Lyon: Ed. Libel. ISBN 978-2-917659-07-6. OCLC 822829581.
