= Gisèle Freund =

French photographer (1908–2000)

- Self portrait with camera, Mexico City 1950
- Born: 19 December 1908; Berlin, Germany
- Died: 31 March 2000 (aged 91); Paris, France
- Education: University of Freiburg; University of Frankfurt; Sorbonne (Ph.D. in sociology)
- Known for: Photography
- Spouse: Pierre Blum (m. 1935; div. 1948)
- Awards: Officier des Arts et Lettres; Chevalier de la Légion d'honneur

Gisèle Freund (born Gisela Freund; 19 December 1908 – 31 March 2000) was a German-born French photographer and photojournalist, famous for her documentary photography and portraits of writers and artists. Her best-known book, Photographie et société (1974), is an expanded edition of her seminal 1936 dissertation. It was the first sociohistorical study on photography as a democratic medium of self-representation in the age of technological reproduction. With this first doctoral thesis on photography at the Sorbonne, she was one of the first women habilitated there.

Freund's major contributions to photography include using the Leica Camera (with its ability to house 35 mm film rolls with 36 frames) for documentary reportage and pioneering Kodachrome and Agfacolor positive film for colour portraits of writers and artists, which allowed her to develop a "uniquely candid portraiture style" that distinguishes her in 20th-century photography.

Politically left-leaning all her life, she became president of the French Union of Photographers in 1977. In 1981, she took the official portrait of French President François Mitterrand, and was made Officier des Arts et Lettres in 1982 and Chevalier de la Légion d'honneur, the highest decoration in France, in 1983. In 1991, she became the first photographer to be honored with a retrospective at the Musée national d'art moderne in Paris.

== Biography ==
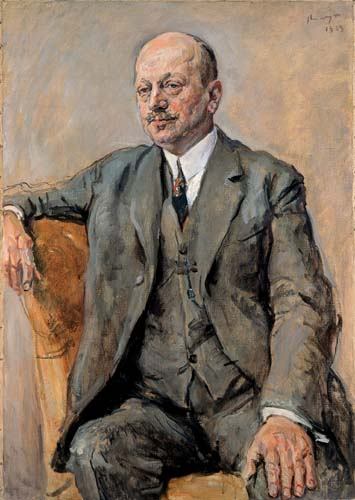
Max Slevogt, Portrait of Julius Freund, 1925

=== Early years ===
Freund was born in Schöneberg (Berlin) into a textile merchant family, her parents being Julius and Clara (née Dressel) Freund, a wealthy Jewish couple.

Her father, Julius Freund, was a keen art collector, Max Slevogt, Käthe Kollwitz and Max Liebermann were friends of the family. He had an interest in photography as well, like the work of Karl Blossfeldt, whose close-up studies explored the forms of natural objects. Freund's father bought Gisèle her first camera, a Voigtländer 6 × 9 in 1925 and a Leica camera as a present for her graduation in 1929.

In 1931, Freund studied sociology and art history at Albert-Ludwigs-Universität Freiburg, Breisgau, Germany; and in 1932 and 1933 she studied at the University of Frankfurt under Theodor W. Adorno, Karl Mannheim and Norbert Elias (also known as the Frankfurt School). At university she became an active member of a student socialist group and was determined to use photography as an integral part of her socialist practice. One of her first stories, shot on 1 May 1932, "shows a recent march of anti-fascist students" who had been "regularly attacked by Nazi groups".

=== Paris ===
In March 1933, some weeks after Adolf Hitler and his regime rose to power in Germany, Walter Benjamin fled to Paris. On 30 May, Gisèle followed him since she was both a socialist activist and a Jew. She escaped to Paris with her negatives strapped around her body to get them past the border guards. Gisèle and Walter Benjamin would continue their friendship in Paris, where Freund would famously photograph him reading at the National Library. They both studied and wrote about art in the 19th and 20th centuries as Freund continued her studies at the Sorbonne.

Although she was fascinated by portrait photography, Freund never had taken any serious portraits and at that point saw the camera merely as "an instrument for sociological research". André Malraux was the first to ask her to photograph him for an upcoming book, not a conventional portrait, but in a more candid fashion, that was trending in Paris at the time. So they stepped out onto the terrace. The photographs she took of him that day were used by publishers repeatedly the following decades. Being acquainted now, Malraux invited Freund to document the First International Congress in Defence of Culture in Paris of 1935, where she was introduced to and subsequently photographed many of the notable French artists of her day. Freund befriended the famed literary partners, Sylvia Beach of Shakespeare and Company, and Adrienne Monnier of Maison des Amis des Livres. In 1935, Monnier arranged a marriage of convenience for Freund with Pierre Blum so that Freund could obtain a residence permit to remain in France legally (they officially divorced after the war in 1948).

In 1936, while Sylvia Beach was visiting the United States, Freund moved into Monnier and Beach's shared apartment and they became intimates. When Beach returned, she ended her intimate relationship with Monnier yet maintained a strong friendship with both Monnier and Freund. Freund finished her Ph.D. in sociology and art at the Sorbonne in 1936, and published her doctoral dissertation as "La photographie en France au dix-neuvième siècle", under the La Maison des Amis des Livres imprint by Monnier.

Monnier "introduced [Freund] to the artists and writers who would prove her most captivating subjects." Later that year, Freund became internationally recognized with her photojournalistic piece "Northern England", which was published in Life magazine on 14 December 1936, and showed the effects of the Depression in England. No magazine in France could publish color photographs at that time, so Freund's work with Life—one of the first color mass magazines—would start a lifelong relationship between the photographer and magazine.

In 1938, Monnier suggested that Freund photograph James Joyce for his upcoming book, Finnegans Wake. Joyce, who disliked being photographed, invited Freund to his Paris flat for a private screening of her previous work. He was impressed enough by Freund's work to allow her to photograph him, and over a period of three days, she captured the most intimate portraits of Joyce during his time in Paris. During one of the sessions he hit his head on a light and cut his forehead. Joyce exclaimed, "I'm bleeding. Your damned photos will be the death of me", which he said, "forgetting in his pain that he had made it a rule never to swear in the presence of a lady." Right after the photo-session her taxi crashed, which damaged her cameras and ruined the films. She told Joyce and being superstitious, Joyce was convinced that his cursing had caused the crash, so he invited Freund back to his home for a second round of photographs. Time magazine used one of these photos for its cover on 8 May 1939. The entire series of photographs would eventually be published in 1965 in James Joyce in Paris: His Final Years by Freund and V. B. Carleton and a preface by Simone de Beauvoir.

In 1939, after being "twice refused admission to Tavistock Square", Freund gained the confidence of Virginia Woolf and captured the iconic color photographs of the Woolfs on display in the English National Portrait Gallery. Woolf even "agreed to change her clothes to see which best suited the colour harmony and insisted on being photographed with Leonard (and their spaniel Pinka). In some of the prints, Woolf is pale and lined, in others smiling a little and more youthful. The background of fabrics and mural panels by Bell and Grant adds to the value of the images; this was the inner sanctum of the queen of Bloomsbury where parties were given and friends came to tea. Just over a year later the house was destroyed in The Blitz."

On 10 May 1940, the Wehrmacht started the Battle of France by invading the Benelux states. On 10 June 1940, with the Nazi invasion of Paris looming, Freund escaped Paris to the free zone in the Dordogne. Her husband by convenience, Pierre, had been captured and deported to a prison camp. He was able to escape and met with Freund before going back to Paris to fight in the French Resistance. As the wife of an escaped prisoner, a Jew, and a socialist, Freund "feared for her life".

In February 1939, half a year before the beginning of World War II, her parents had finally fled Germany to Great Britain, and Nazi Germany confiscated all their belongings (Reich Flight Tax); they had to leave behind. Her father died two years later, and her mother, penniless, was forced to sell the art collection, that had already been moved to neutral Switzerland in 1933, shortly after Hitler's Machtergreifung.

=== Buenos Aires, Mexico, and Paris again ===
In 1942, with the help of André Malraux, who told his friends, "we must save Gisèle!", Freund fled to Buenos Aires, Argentina "at the invitation of Victoria Ocampo, director of the periodical Sur. Ocampo was at the center of the Argentinean intellectual elite, and through her Freund met and photographed many great writers and artists, such as Jorge Luis Borges and Pablo Neruda."

While living in Argentina, Freund started a publishing venture called Ediciones Victoria, that would feature books on France. She writes, "in reality, I started this for the De Gaulle government in exile where I was working in the Information ministry, voluntarily, without payment." She also founded a relief action committee for French artists and became a spokesperson for Free France. After the war she got back to Paris in 1946 with an exhibition on Latin America ready, and three tons of collected provisions for writers and journalists.

In 1947, Freund signed a contract with Magnum Photos as a Latin America contributor, but by 1954, she was declared persona non grata by the U.S. government at the height of the Red Scare for her socialist views, and Robert Capa forced her to break ties with Magnum, to save himself and David Seymour from investigations of the FBI. In 1950, her photo coverage of a bejewelled Evita Perón for Life magazine caused a diplomatic stir between the United States and Argentina and upset many of Perón's supporters—the ostentatious photographs went against the official party line of austerity; Life was blacklisted in Argentina, and once again, Freund had to escape a country with her negatives. She moved to Mexico and became friends with Diego Rivera, Frida Kahlo, Alfaro Siqueiros, and José Clemente Orozco.

In 1953, she moved back to Paris permanently. Over the life of her career, she went on over 80 photojournalistic assignments for Life, Time, The Sunday Times, Picture Post, Weekly Illustrated, and the French Vu, Paris Match, Points de Vue, and Arts et Décoration, as well as the Swiss Du. From the 1960s onward, Freund continued to write. The "continuation" of her dissertation, now called Photography & Society, came out in 1974, written in French, and translated into German the same year. The English translation followed in 1980. Further editions came out in Spanish (1976), Swedish (1977), Korean (1979), Italian (1980), Croatian (1981), Japanese (1986), Greek (1996), and Turkish (2007). In 1977, she became president of the Fédération Française des Associations des Photographes Créateurs, the photographer's trade union, a position Henri Cartier-Bresson previously held.

The same year Germany saw her first retrospective curated by Klaus Honnef (de), who also accounted for her participation in the documenta 6. This edition of the important international exhibition for contemporary art, had a focus on photography and celebrated its 150-year anniversary with a large survey, in which pictures of Joyce and Evita Perón were featured in its portrait section. In the 1970s she was also recognized in the US, in galleries at first, and it was a large exhibition of her works at the Sidney Janis Gallery in New York in 1979. It led to the acquisition of all 180 photographs on display by the Center for Creative Photography at the University of Arizona in Tucson. Her reputation as an important portrait photographer grew with each successive exhibition. She was celebrated as one of the best portrait photographers of the twentieth century: Upon her death in Paris, "President Jacques Chirac praised her as 'one of the world's greatest photographers'."

She is buried at the Montparnasse Cemetery in Paris near her home and studio at 12 rue Lalande.

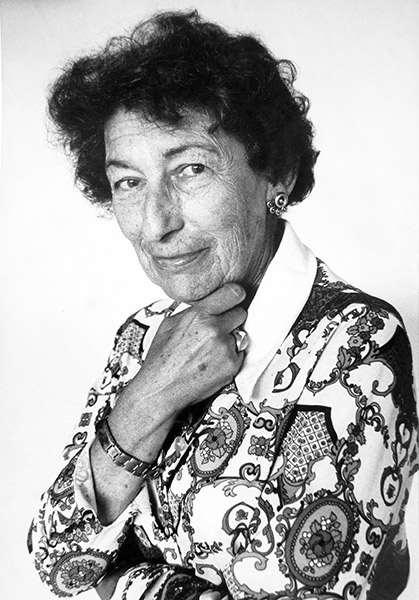
Gisèle Freund, Paris 1974, photographed by Hans Puttnies

== Estate ==
Since 2011 Freund's principal estate is managed through l'Institut Mémoires de l'Édition Contemporaine (IMEC) in Paris and stored at Abbaye d'Ardenne, near Caen. The collection contains portraits and some series of journalistic photographs from France, Germany, England and Latin America, in total around 1600 black and white negatives with their contact sheets, 1200 color and black and white prints, 8200 slides (originals and duplicates) and approximately the same number of press prints. Besides the photographs the collection comprises manuscripts, notebooks, diaries, letters and documents pertaining to exhibitions and the management of her archive. Her library of about 2000 books and journals is also part of the collection.

Since the end of 2022 the Jewish Museum in Frankfurt holds another part of her estate. Formerly in the hands of Hans Puttnies (1946–2020), who had closely worked with Gisèle Freund for over twenty years, the museum bought, with the financial help of the city, his collection of photographs, writings and other documents and belongings of her. It comprises 32 archive boxes with over 1.150 photographs spanning the years of 1927 to 1975, over half of them vintage prints, many never been shown publicly. Besides personal notes, address books and correspondences there are previously unreleased manuscripts, such as a typoscript of an unfinished autobiographical novel Freund wrote in Mexico between 1952–1954.

Hans Puttnies, professor of communication studies, author, photographer and film maker, became friends with Freund, after he wrote a review on a German edition of her original dissertation in 1968. Puttnies collaborated with her on several projects and provided essays for exhibition catalogues of her works. Over the years Freund had given him many photographs and he had photographed her. He was about to write Freund's biography but died before finishing it in 2020.

== Notable work ==
Freund's dissertation was a seminal sociohistorical study on photography, first published in book form by Adrienne Monnier in 1936, and a revised version was published in the 1970s with translations in several languages. One of her best-known early photo works shows one of the last political street demonstrations in Germany before Hitler took power. In 1936 Freund photographed the effects of the depression in England for Life. Freund became famous for her colour portraits of writers and artists, including Samuel Beckett, Virginia Woolf, George Bernard Shaw, Henry Matisse, Marcel Duchamp and many others. In 1981, Freund made her (unretouched) official portrait of François Mitterrand, who was President of France (1981–1995).

In Freund's obituary for The New York Times, Suzanne Daley writes, "[Freund] specialized in conveying the attitude of her subjects. She focused on hands, body posture and clothing. Reviewing an exhibition of her life's work in 1979, Hilton Kramer wrote in The New York Times that she excelled in 'brilliant documentation rather than originality.' In a 1996 interview, Ms. Freund said she read her subjects' work and often spent hours discussing their books with them before taking a portrait." Indeed, it was Freund's ability to connect with writers and artists—especially the famously difficult James Joyce—that gave her the ability to photograph them with their guard down.

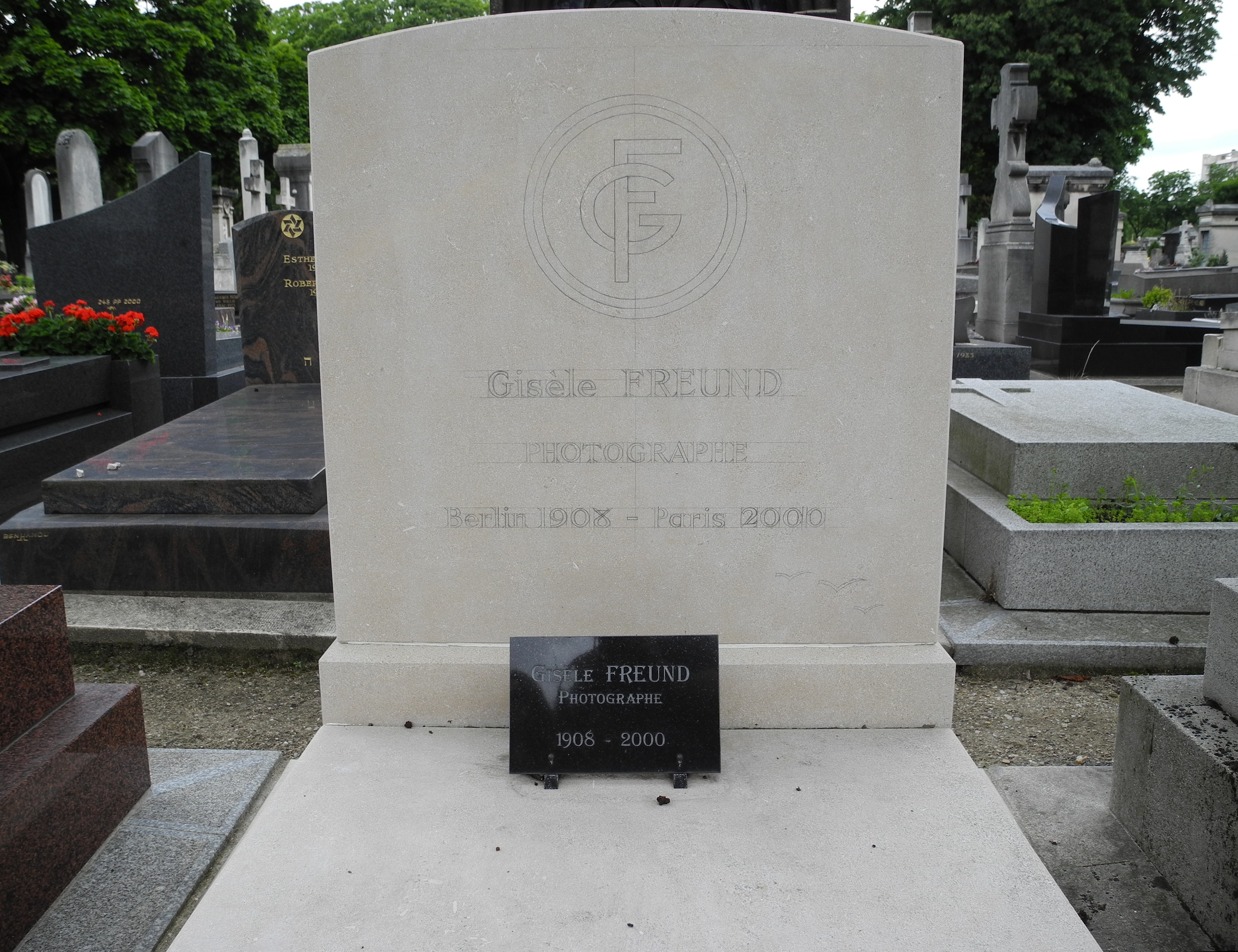
Gisèle Freund's gravestone at Montparnasse Graveyard, Paris

== Quotations ==
From Gisèle Freund, Photographer (1985)

- "For a writer, his portrait is the only link he can establish with his readers. When we read a book whose content moves us, we are interested to look at the author's face, which is generally printed on the jacket since the publisher is aware of our wish to see if these features correspond to the idea we have formed of the author. This image is thus very important to the man of letters. He prefers a photographer in whom he can have confidence."

From Photography & Society

- "The lens, the so-called impartial eye, actually permits every possible distortion of reality: the character of the image is determined by the photographer's point of view and the demands of his patrons. The importance of photography does not rest primarily in its potential as an art form, but rather in its ability to shape our ideas, to influence our behaviour, and to define our society." (p. 4)
- "In our technological age, when industry is always trying to create new needs, the photographic industry has expanded enormously because the photograph meets modem man's pressing need to express his own individuality." (p. 5)
- Although the first inventor of photography, Nicéphore Niépce, tried desperately to have his invention recognized, his efforts were in vain and he died in misery. Few people know his name today. But photography, which he discovered, has become the most common language of our civilization." (p. 218)
- "When you do not like human beings, you cannot make good portraits."

== Awards ==
- 1977 – Elected President of the trade union Fédération Française des Associations des Photographes Créateurs (France)
- 1977 – Guest of honor at the annual international festival Rencontres de la photographie d'Arles (France)
- 1978 – Cultural Prize of the German Society for Photography DGPh (Germany)
- 1980 – Grand Prix national de la photographie (France)
- 1982 – Officier des Arts et Lettres (France)
- 1983 – Chevalier de la Légion d'Honneur (France)
- 1987 – Officier de Mérite (France)
- 1989 – Doctor honoris causa, National Museum of Photography at Bradford University (UK)

== Exhibitions ==
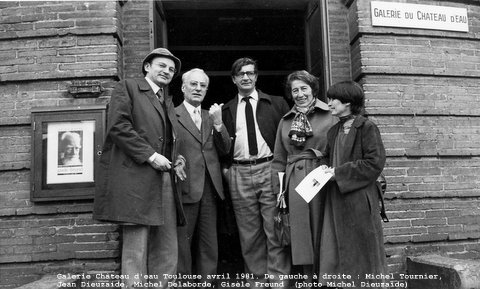
Gisèle Freund (second at right) at the opening of her exhibition at Galerie municipale du Château d'Eau, Toulouse, March 1981 with (from left) Michel Tournier, Jean Dieuzaide, Michel Delaborde, unidentified woman. Photographed by Michel Dieuzaide

- 1939 – La Maison des Amis des Livres, Paris, France
- 1942 – Galerie Amigos del Arte, Buenos Aires, Argentina
- 1945 – Palacio de Bellas Artes, Valparaiso Galeria de Arte, Buenos Aires, Argentina
- 1946 – Maison de l'Amérique latine, Paris, France
- 1962 – Musée des Beaux-Arts de la Ville de Paris, Petit Palais, France
- 1963 – Le portrait francais au XXe siecle [French Portraiture in the 20th Century], Bibliothèque nationale de France, Cabinet des estampes, Paris, France & Berlin and Düsseldorf, Germany
- 1964 – Ecrivains et artistes français et britanniques, Institut Francais du Royaume-Uni, London, U.K.
- 1965 – Princeton Art Museum, US
- 1966 – American Center, Paris, France
- 1968 – Au pays des visages, 1938–1968: trente ans d'art et de littérature à travers la caméra de Gisèle Freund [In the realm of faces: thirty years of art and literature through the lens of Gisèle Freund], Musée d'Art Moderne de Paris & Fondation Rayaumont, Asnieres-sur-Oise
- 1973 – Musée Descartes, Amsterdam, Netherlands
- 1975 – Giselle Freund [sic], Robert Schoelkopf Gallery, New York, US
- 1976 – Focus Gallery, San Francisco, California, US
- 1977 – Gisèle Freund: Fotografien 1932–1977, Rheinisches Landesmuseum Bonn, Germany (first major retrospective, catalogue)

– Documenta 6, Kassel, Germany
– Musée Réattu, Rencontres de la photographie d'Arles, Arles, France
– Fotoforum, Frankfurt, Germany
– David Mirvich Gallery, Toronto, Canada

- 1978 – Watari Museum of Contemporary Art, Tokyo, Japan

– Shadai Gallery, Tokyo, Japan
– Marcus Krakow Gallery, Boston, US

- 1979 – Sidney Janis Gallery, New York, US (catalogue)
- 1980 – Galerie Agathe Gaillard, Paris, France

– Galerie photo art basel (Anita Neugebauer), Basel, Switzerland

- 1981 – Galerie municipale du Chateau d'Eau, Toulouse, France

– Center for Creative Photography, Tucson, Arizona, US
– Axiom Gallery, Sydney, Australia.

- 1982 – Koplin Gallery, Los Angeles, US

– The Photographers' Gallery, London

- 1983 – Boston National Library[?], US

– Center for Creative Art, New Orleans, US
– Stanford University Museum of Art

- 1984 – Fotoforum, Frankfurt, Germany
- 1987 – Galerie zur Stockeregg, Zurich, Switzerland

– Photographs of James Joyce and Friends, Gotham Book Mart & Gallery, New York, US

- 1988 – Gisèle Freund, Werkbund-Archiv, Museum der Alltagskultur des 20. Jahrhunderts, Berlin, Germany (catalogue), and Vidéothèque de Paris, Paris
- 1989 – Gisèle Freund: James Joyce, 1939, Galerie de France, Paris, France

– Gisèle Freund, James Joyce in Paris, Galerie photo art basel, Basel, Switzerland

- 1991 – Itinéraires, retrospective, Musée national d'art moderne, Centre Georges Pompidou, Paris (catalogue)

– Galerie photo art basel, Basel, Switzerland
– Frida Kahlo et ses amis, Galerie de France, Paris

- 1992 – Museum of Contemporary Art (Aguascalientes), Mexico City

– Gisèle Freund: die Frau mit der Kamera. Fotografien 1929–1988, Hammoniale - Festival der Frauen, BAT-Kunstfoyer, Hamburg. Selection of her photographs of women by Freund (catalogue)

- 1993 – Gisèle Freund, Seoul Museum of Art, Seoul, South Korea
- 1994 – Galerie Clairefontaine, Luxembourg

– Reportagen, Museum für Photographie, Braunschweig, Germany (catalogue)

- 1995 – Fotografien zum 1. Mai 1932, Museum of Modern Art, Frankfurt, Germany (catalogue)
- 1996 – Gisèle Freund, 1st International Congress of Writers for the Defence of Culture, Paris 1935, Goethe Institute, Paris, France

– Gesichter der Sprache. Sprengel Museum, Hanover, Germany (catalogue)
– Malraux sous le regard de Gisèle Freund, Galerie nationale du Jeu de Paume, Paris, France
– Verso Gallery, Tokyo, Japan
– Galerie Michiko Matsumoto, Tokyo, Japan
– Gisèle Freund: Berlin, Frankfurt, Paris. Fotografien 1929–1962, Berliner Festspiele, Berlin, Germany (catalogue)

- 1999 – Adrienne Monnier, Saint-John Perse et les amis des livres, Musée Municipal Saint-John Perse, Point-à-Pitre, and the Fondation Saint-John Perse, Aix-en-Provence, France
- 2002–2004 – Gisèle Freund. El mundo y mi cámara, travelling retrospective in Spain: Centre de Cultura Contemporanea, Barcelona, Museu Comarcal de la Garrotxa, Olot, Caja General de Ahorros de Granada, Fundació Sa Nostra in Palma de Mallorca, Fundación Municipal de Cultura, Valladolid (catalogue)
- 2006 – Susana Soca and her circles seen by Gisèle Freund. Maison de l'Amerique latine, Paris, France

– Montevideo and Soca, Uruguay

- 2008 – Gisèle Freund: ritratti d'autore, 1908–2008, cento anni dalla nascita, Galleria Carla Sozzani, Milan, Italy (catalogue)

– Gisèle Freund – Photojournalism and Portraiture. Tribute to Gisèle Freund on Her 100th Anniversary, Photomeetings Luxembourg, Galerie Clairefontaine (100 photographs from the collection of Marita Ruiter), and symposium and exhibition at the University of Luxembourg (catalogue)

– Gisèle Freund – Reportagen und Portraits zum 100. Geburtstag, Willy-Brandt-Haus, Berlin (adopted from Luxembourg)

– Gisèle Freund – Wiedersehen mit Berlin, 1957–1962, Ephraim-Palais, Berlin, Germany

- 2011–2012 – Gisèle Freund: l'œil frontière, Fondation Pierre Bergé–Yves Saint Laurent, Paris, France 1933-1940" (catalogue)
- 2014 – From Paris to Victoria: Gisèle Freund's James Joyce Photographs, University of Victoria, Canada
- 2014 – Gisèle Freund: Photographische Szenen und Porträts. Academy of Arts, Berlin, Germany (catalogue)
- 2015 – Frida Kahlo: Mirror, Mirror, Throckmorton Fine Art, New York, US
- 2018 – Gisèle Freund – Frida Kahlo & Diego Rivera, Galerie Clairefontaine, Luxembourg (catalogue); Galleria Guidi & Schoen, Genoa, Italy; FLATZ Museum, Dornbirn, Austria
- 2022 – Gisèle Freund – Ce sud si lointain. Photographies d'Amérique latine, Maison de l'Amérique latine, Paris, France

== Books by Gisèle Freund ==
Even for publications without texts of her own, especially exhibition catalogues, Freund's collaboration was essential. Original editions followed by translations into other languages are listed, as long as no English translation was published.

- La photographie en France au dix-neuvième siècle [French Photography in the 19th Century], dissertation, La Maison des Amis des Livres, Paris1936. OCLC 459756792.
  - Spanish ed.: La fotografía y las clases medias en Francia durante el siglo 19 ensayo de sociologia y de estética, Ed. Losada, Buenos Aires 1946. OCLC 723790301.
  - German ed.: Photographie und bürgerliche Gesellschaft. Eine kunstsoziologische Studie, preface by H. P. Gente, Rogner & Bernhard (Passagen), München 1968.
  - French re-ed.: André Gunthert (ed.), Christian Bourgois/Seuil (Points), 2011, ISBN 9782267022650.
- France, 1945.
- Guía de arquitectura mexicana contemporánea [Guide to Contemporary Mexican Architecture], Carlos Lazo [and/or] Richard Grove, Congreso Panamericano de Arquitectos, Espacios, Mexico City 1952. OCLC 253089502.
- Mexique précolombien [Pre-Columbian Mexico], text by Paul Rivet, Editions Ides et Calendes, Neuchatel 1954. OCLC 899221495.
  - German ed.: Alt-Mexiko, Reich, München 1954. OCLC 265428042.
- James Joyce in Paris: His Final Years, foreword by Simone de Beauvoir, text by Verna B. Carleton, Harcourt, Brace & World, New York 1965, ISBN 1111804478. Archive-url.
- Au pays des visages, 1938–1968: Trente ans d'art et de littérature à travers la caméra de Gisèle Freund, Freund with Pierre Gaudibert, Musée d'art moderne de la ville de Paris, 1968, w/o ISBN.
- Le monde et ma camera, memoir, Denoël, Paris 1970, ISBN 9782207257920 (2006 ed.).
  - English ed.: The World and My Camera, The Dial Press, New York 1974, ISBN 080379732X.
- Photographie et societé, revised and expanded edition of her dissertation, Seuil (Coll. Points), Paris 1974, ISBN 202000660X.
  - English ed., US: Photography & Society, David R. Godine, Boston 1980, ISBN 0879232501,
  - English ed., UK: Gordon Fraser, London 1980, ISBN 0860920496.
- Memoires de l'œil [Memories of the Eye], Seuil, Paris 1977, ISBN 2020046474. (Also published in German the same year.)
- Portfolio: Au pays des visages [In the Landscape of Faces], ed. of 36 signed copies with ten portraits, Lunn Gallery/Graphics International, 1978.
- Trois jours avec Joyce, Denoël, Paris 1982, ISBN 2207228061.
  - English ed., US: Three Days with Joyce, Persea, New York 1985, ISBN 9780892550968. Archive-url.
  - English ed., Europe: Van Gennep, Amsterdam 1985, ISBN 9060126637.
- Gisèle Freund, Photographien (und Erinnerungen), with autobiographical texts, foreword by Christian Caujolle, Schirmer/Mosel, Munich, ISBN 3888141605.
  - French ed.: Itinéraires, Albin Michel, Paris 1985, ISBN 9782226024718.
  - English ed.: Gisèle Freund, Photographer, Abrams, New York 1985, ISBN 9780810909397.
- Gisèle Freund. Poetry of the Portrait: Photographs of Writers and Artists, Engl. ed. by Roger W. Benner, preface by Freund, Schirmer Art Books (Masters of the Camera), Munich 1989, ISBN 9783888148903.
- Gisèle Freund: itinéraires. Catalogue de l'œuvre photographique, Musée national d'art moderne, ed. by Alain Sayag, complete catalogue by Hans Puttnies, Ed. Centre Georges Pompidou, Paris, 1991, ISBN 9782858506460.
- Gisèle Freund, Portrait. Entretiens avec Rauda Jamis, interviews with Rauda Jamis, Des Femmes, Paris 1991, ISBN 9782721004222. (Also published in German, 1993).

== Books on Gisèle Freund ==
- Honnef, Klaus (1977). Gisèle Freund: Fotografien 1932–1977 (in German). Bonn: Rheinisches Landesmuseum.
- Neyer, Hans Joachim (1988). Gisèle Freund (in German). Berlin: Argon, Museumspädagogischer Dienst. OCLC 21045272.
- Puttnies, Hans (1992). Hammoniale - Festival der Frauen, BAT-Kunstfoyer (ed.). Gisèle Freund: die Frau mit der Kamera. Fotografien 1929–1988 [The woman with the camera] (in German). München: Schirmer/Mosel. OCLC 21045272.
- "Fotografin Gisèle Freund. Der Archipel der Erinnerung" [The archipel of memory]. Du (in German). No. 3. Zürich: TA-Media. March 1993.
- Flavell, M. Kay (1994). You Have Seen Their Faces: Gisèle Freund, Walter Benjamin and Margaret Bourke-White as headhunters of the thirties. Berkeley: University of California, Center for German and European Studies. OCLC 32087994.
- Neyer-Schoop, Irene; Weski, Thomas (1996). Gesichter der Sprache. Schriftsteller um Adrienne Monnier. Fotografien zwischen 1935 und 1940 von Gisèle Freund [Faces of Language] (in German). Hannover: Sprengel Museum. ISBN 978-3-89169-107-6.
- Braun-Ruiter, Marita (1996). Gisèle Freund: Berlin, Frankfurt, Paris. Fotografien 1929–1962 (in German). Berlin: Berliner Festspiele.
- Perolini, Elisabeth; Neri, Grazia (2007). Gisèle Freund: ritratti d'autore [Portraits of writers] (in Italian). Silvana. ISBN 9788836609857. OCLC 190838214.
- Cosnac, Bettina de (2008). Gisèle Freund. Ein Leben (in German). Zürich: Arche. ISBN 9783716023822.
- Gisèle Freund. El mundo y mi cámara/The World and My Camera (in Spanish and English). Madrid: Ariel. 2008. ISBN 9788434452404. (Original edition in Catalan)
- Ruiter, Marita (2008). Gisèle Freund – Photojournalism and Portraiture. Tribute to Gisèle Freund on Her 100th Anniversary. Luxembourg: Ed. Clairefontaine. ISBN 978-2-919881-27-7.
- Corpet, Olivier; Thiek, Catherine (2011). Gisèle Freund: l'oeil frontière, Paris 1933–1940 [The eye at the border (?)] (in French). Paris: Réunion des musées nationaux, Fondation Pierre Bergé-Yves Saint Laurent. ISBN 978-2-7118-5924-5. OCLC 770222870.
- Les carnets de Gisèle Freund [The notebooks] (in French). Paris: Réunion des musées nationaux, Petit Palais. 2013. ISBN 978-2-7118-5925-2.
- Frecot, Janos; Kostas, Gabriele (2014). Gisèle Freund: Photographische Szenen und Porträts (in German). Berlin: Nicolai. ISBN 9783894798482.
- Cortanze, Gerard de (2015). Frida Kahlo. The Gisèle Freund Photographs. New York: Abrams. ISBN 978-1-4197-1423-8.

== Film and television ==
The 1996 documentary Paris Was a Woman features interviews with Gisèle Freund as she recollects her experiences in Paris during the 1930s.

1979 Zeugen des Jahrhunderts: Gisèle Freund [Witnesses of the Century].

2019 Gisèle Freund, portrait intime d'une photographe visionnaire, Director Teri Wehn-Damisch.
