= Jean Gaumy =

French photographer and filmmaker (born 1948)

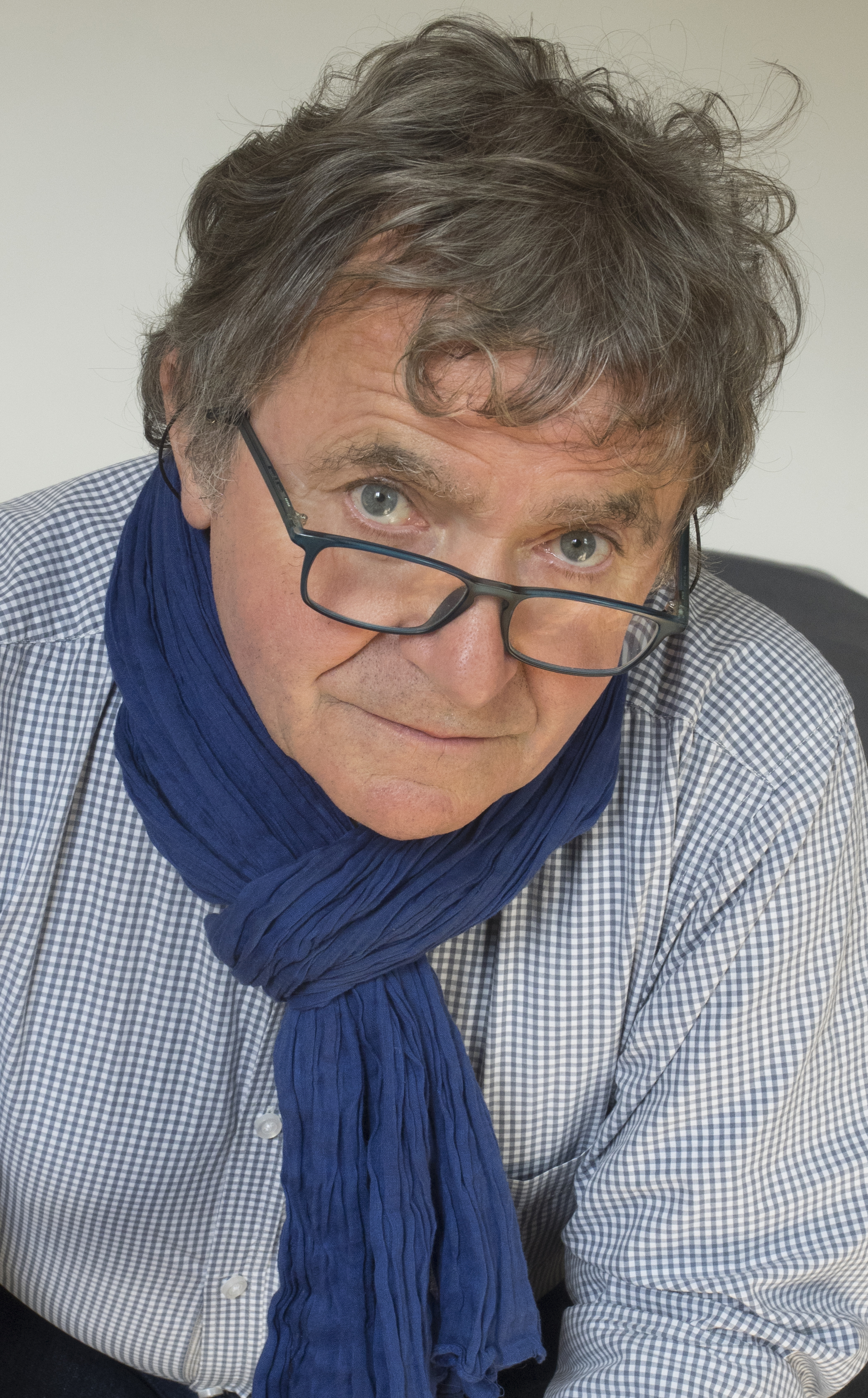
Jean Gaumy self-portrait

Jean Gaumy (born 1948) is a French photographer and filmmaker who has been associated with Magnum Photos since 1977 who has specialised in depictions of isolated or confined communities and groups.

== Early life and education ==
Jean Gaumy was born on 28 August 1948 in Royan Pontaillac (Charente-Maritime), France. He attended schools in Toulouse and Aurillac, then undertook his higher education in Rouen, before working as editor and freelance photographer in the Paris-Normandy area.

== Career ==
Gaumy was a member of the Viva agency before he was recruited for French Gamma in 1973 by Raymond Depardon. In 1975 he undertook extended documentation of subjects never before broached in France; the first, "L’Hopital" was published in 1976; the second, "Les Incarcérés", on French prisons was made in 1976 and published in 1983 with extracts from his personal journal written in the first person. In 1976 his work was noticed by Marc Riboud and Bruno Barbey at Rencontres d’Arles and at their invitation in 1977 he joined Magnum.

== Pleine Mer ==
In 1984 Gaumy started a cycle of winter voyages aboard so-called "classic" trawlers which continued until 1998 and led to the publication in 2001 of Pleine Mer ("Men at Sea"). Gaumy was aware that the open-deck trawlers, the boats on which he was photographing, were disappearing, like the Portuguese schooners that had fished for cod on the Grand Banks, their men line-fishing from open dories; competition from South American fishing vessels was too strong. Peter Nichols commended Gaumy's project and the book in a July 2002 Guardian review; "Men at Sea is both a rare and a beautiful book, and an archival testament of a world fast slipping away. Or already gone." François Cardi's 2014 paper on the sociology of deepwater fishing uses an extended analysis and comparison of the earlier mid-century fishing-boat imagery of Anita Conti with that of Jean Gaumy.

== Filmmaker ==
In 1984 Gaumy made his first film La Boucane, and it was nominated for a César in 1986 for best documentary. He followed it with other film all broadcast by French and European televisions, and winning further awards. In 1986 he made his first trip to Iran during the war, continuing visits there until 1997. His film Jean-Jacques (1987) was made during two years chronicling the town of Octeville-sur-Mer, where he lived, through the eyes of Jean-Jacques unjustly considered the "village idiot". His third feature-length film Marcel, prêtre (1994) was shot in Raulhac (Auvergne, Cantal) over a period of several years.

During 2005 he researched locations in preparation for the film Sous-Marin for which he spent four months underwater aboard a nuclear attack submarine. Since then, his numerous works on human confinement have been coupled with a more contemplative photographic approach. After making his film aboard a nuclear submarine, in 2008 he started a photographic reconnaissance extending from the Arctic seas to the contaminated lands of Chernobyl in Ukraine (2008, 2009) and Fukushima, Japan (2012). Concurrently, within the same project, he started a series of mountain landscapes that will be published in the book D’après Nature (2010) and for which received a second Nadar Prize. During 2010 and 2011 Gaumy re-embarked on voyages aboard the "Terrible", the latest French submarine SNLA dedicated to nuclear deterrence, and in 2013 joined the international scientific team BB Polar with which he went to Spitsbergen and Greenland (2013, 2014 and 2016)

== Bibliography ==
- Jean Gaumy, Actes Sud. Coll PhotoPoche. Text by Alain Bergala, 2010
- D'après Nature, Xavier Barral, France. English, Italian and French texts, 2010
- Pleine Mer, La Martinière, France, 2001, ISBN 978-2-7324-2732-4; Men at Sea, Harry N. Abrams, USA, 2002, ISBN 978-0-8109-1198-7; Mare Aperto, Contrasto, Italy, 2002; Auf hoher See, Knesebeck, Germany, 2002
- Le Livre des Tempêtes à bord de l’Abeille Flandre, Seuil, France, 2001, ISBN 978-2-02-042622-0
- Le Pont de Normandie, Le Cherche-Midi, France, 1995, ISBN 978-2-86274-334-9
- Les Incarcérés, L’Etoile/Cahiers du Cinéma, France, 1983, ISBN 978-2-86642-009-3
- L’Hôpital, Contrejour, France, 1976, ISBN 978-2-85949-003-4

== Filmography ==
- Sous-Marin (video, color, 5x25'), 2006
- Marcel, Prêtre (16mm, color, 42'), 1994
- Jean-Jacques (16mm, color, 52'), 1987
- La Boucane (16mm, color, 35'), 1984

== Awards and nominations ==
- Institut de France (Academy des Beaux Arts), 2016
- Named Peintre Officiel de la Marine, 2008
- Prix Nadar, France, 2001 et 2010
- Prix du film document de Belfort (for "Jean-Jacques") France, 1987
- Nomination for a César Award (for La Boucane) (short-documentary category) France, 1986
- Prix du premier film au Festival du Film Ethnologique, Paris, France, 1984

== Collections ==
- National Maritime Museum of Paris, France
- Centre Beaubourg, Paris, France
- Public Collection, the National Library, France
- National Photography Foundation, Lyon, France
- Magnum Photos collection, Harry Ransom Center, University of Texas at Austin
