= Prix Nadar =

French photography award

The Prix Nadar is an annual prize awarded for a photography book edited in France. The prize was created in 1955 by Association Gens d'Images and is awarded by a jury of photojournalists and publishing experts.

The prize is named after Nadar, the pseudonym of Gaspard-Félix Tournachon, a French photographer who lived from 1820 to 1910.

== Some Prix Nadar winners ==
- Werner Bischof, 1955 (Japon = Japan)
- Fulvio Roiter, 1956 (Ombrie, Terre de Saint François)
- William Klein, 1957 (New York)
- Michel Cot, 1958 (La Glace à Deux Faces)
- Jean Dieuzaide, 1961
- Alexander Liberman, 1962 (Masters of Contemporary Art)
- Sam Haskins, 1964 (Cowboy Kate and Other Stories)
- Erich Lessing, 1966 (Odyssee)
- Henri Cartier-Bresson, 1971 (Vive la France)
- André Kertész, 1973 (Sixty Years of Photography)
- Gina Lollobrigida, 1974 (Italia Mia)
- Georg Gerster, 1976 (Earth Rights)
- Josef Koudelka, 1978
- Willy Ronis, 1981 (Le Fil du Hasard)
- August Sander, 1982 (Men of the Twentieth Century)
- Jean-Claude Lemagny, 1985
- André Kertész, 1988 (Hologramme)
- Elisabeth Foch, 1990 (Montagne des Photographes)
- Irving Penn, 1991 (By the Way)
- Richard Avedon, 1994 (Evidence 1944–1994)
- Michael Ackerman, 1999 (End Time City)
- Raymond Depardon, 2000 (Detours)
- Olivier Beer, 2001 (Urban Resources)
- Jean Gaumy, 2001
- Larry Burrows, 2002 (Vietnam)
- Bernard Guillot, 2003 (The White House)
- Philippe Bordas, 2004 (Africa With Naked Fists)
- Larry Towell, 2005 (No Man's Land)
- Henri Cartier-Bresson, 2006 (Scrapbook)
- Gilles Mora, 2007 (La Photographie Americaine)
- Sarah Moon, 2008 (1 2 3 4 5, Delpire)
- Quentin Bajac and Clément Chéroux, 2009 (La Subversion des images, surréalism, photographie, film)
- 2010: Jean Gaumy, D'après nature
- 2011: Jean-Christian Bourcart, Camden
- 2012: Marc Riboud, Vers l'Orient
- 2013: Mathieu Pernot (photos) and Philippe Artières (text), L'Asile des photographies
- 2014: Laurent Millet, Les Enfantillages pittoresques
- 2015: Bruno Boudjelal, Algérie, clos comme on ferme un livre ?, Le Bec en l'air
- 2016: Patrick Zachmann, So Long, China
- 2017: Geraldo de Barros, for Sobras (Chose Commune)
- 2018: Paul Fusco, for The Train. 8 juin 1968. Le dernier voyage de Robert F. Kennedy
- 2019: Miho Kajioka, for So it goes (the(M) / Ibasho)
- 2020: Flore, for the book L'odeur de la nuit était celle du jasmin
- 2020: Deanna Dikeman, for Leaving and Waving
