= Chambre noire =

French television show

- Presented by: Michel Tournier; Albert Plécy
- Country of origin: France
- Original language: French
- No. of episodes: 53

Production
- Running time: 50 minutes

Original release
- Network: ORTF

Chambre noire is a French television show dedicated to photography. The show was broadcast between 1961 and 1969.

== Premise ==
Chambre noire was presented by Michel Tournier and Albert Plécy. The show was directed by Claude Fayard. Each episode lasted between 28 and 40 minutes, where notable photographers were interviewed about the artform of photography which was illustrated with photographs and films. Fifty-three episodes were broadcast on channel ORTF, which were released on a monthly basis.
