= Patrick Zachmann =

French photojournalist

Patrick Zachmann (born 1955) is a French photojournalist, based in Paris. He is a full member of Magnum Photos. In 1989 Zachmann received the Niépce Prize, and in 2016 the Prix Nadar for his book So Long, China.

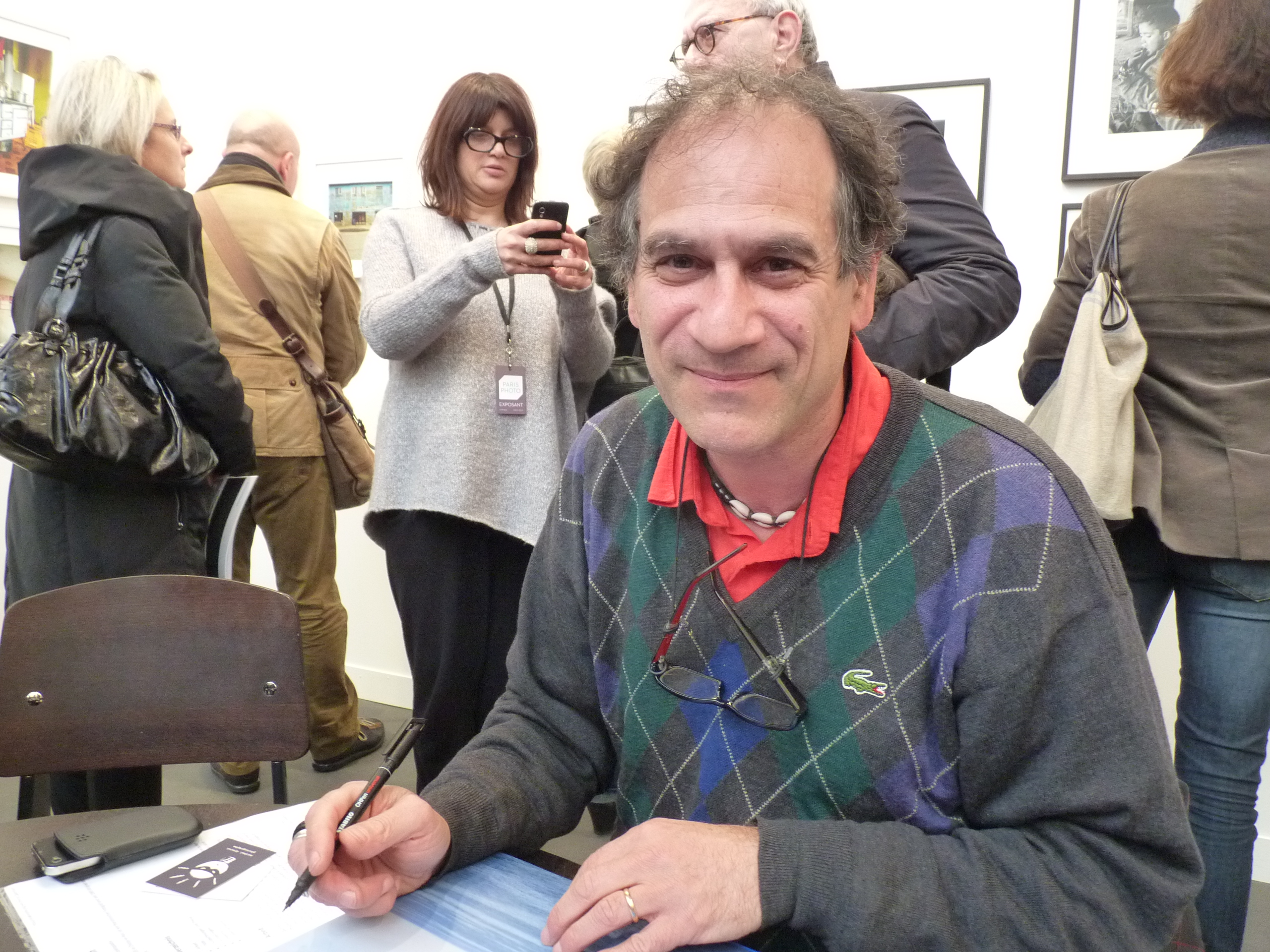
Zachmann in 2013

== Early life ==
Zachmann was born in Choisy-le-Roi, in the southeastern suburbs of Paris.

== Publications ==
- Madonna!. Cahiers du cinéma, 1983.
- Enquête d’identité, un juif à la recherche de sa mémoire. Contrejour, 1987. With Brigitte Dyan.
- 20 ans de rêves. Syria, 1994.
- W. ou l’œil d’un long-nez. Marval, 1995.
- Maliens, ici et là-bas. Plume, 1997.
- Chili, les routes de la mémoire. Marval, 2002.
- Good Nights. Adam Biro, 2008.
- Ma proche banlieue. Paris: Xavier Barral, 2009.
- Patrick Zachmann. Paris: Robert Delpire, 2009.
- So Long, China. Paris: Xavier Barral, 2016. ISBN 978-2-36511-093-8. In French. Contains work from 1970 to 2015. Published on the occasion of an exhibition at the Musée d'Art et d'Histoire du Judaïsme in Paris.
- Notre-Dame. Histoire d'une renaissance. Paris: Bayard, 2021. With Olivier de Châlus. ISBN 978-2227499805. French edition
- Voyages de mémoire. EXB, 2021.

== Awards ==
- 1989: Niépce Prize with Gladys
- 2016: Prix Nadar

== Exhibitions ==
- Patrick Zachmann. Voyages de mémoire, Musée d'Art et d'Histoire du Judaïsme, Paris, December 2021 – March 2022

== Collections ==
Zachmann's work is held in the following permanent collection:

- Musée d'Art et d'Histoire du Judaïsme, Paris: 260 prints made for the exhibition Patrick Zachmann. Journeys of Memory
