= Erich Lessing =

Austrian photographer (1923–2018)

Erich Lessing (13 July 1923 – 29 August 2018) was an Austrian photographer. Lessing became a full member of Magnum Photos in 1955 and was a contributor since 1979. His portraits of poets, musicians, physicists and astronomers were published in around 60 books.

== Career ==
Lessing was born in Vienna into a Jewish family, the son of a dentist and a concert pianist. Before completing high school, he was forced to leave Austria in 1939 because of Hitler's rise to power. He immigrated to the British Mandate for Palestine (now Israel). His mother remained in Vienna and later was murdered at Auschwitz. While in Israel, Lessing studied radio engineering at the Technion and then worked agricultural jobs on kibbutzim. He then joined the British Army as a photographer and aviator.

After World War II, Lessing returned to Austria in 1947 and joined the Associated Press. David Seymour invited Lessing to join Magnum Photos in 1951 and Lessing became a full member in 1955. His photographs were published in Time, Fortune, Life, Paris Match, Picture Post, Epoca and Quick. He documented politics in post-war Europe, especially in Communist countries.

In the 1960s, Lessing turned to more cultural subjects such as art, science, and history, by taking portraits of poets, musicians, physicists, and astronomers. With these photographs, Lessing produced around 60 books.

Lessing taught in Arles, France, at the Venice Biennale, at the Salzburg Summer Academy, and at the Academy of Applied Arts in Vienna. His work has been exhibited throughout the world.

In 2013 he donated 60,000 images to the archives of the Austrian National Library.

== Personal life ==
Lessing was married to the Time journalist Traudl Lessing until her death in 2016. Together they had three children, four grandchildren, and one great-grandson. Lessing later married Renée Kronfuss-Lessing, a psychotherapist. He lived in Vienna, Austria.

Lessing died in August 2018.

== Publications ==
- Szene (Scene). Vienna, Austria: de:Österreichische Staatsdruckerei, 1954. OCLC 2216800
- Imago Austriae
  - Imago Austriae. Freiburg im Breisgau, Austria: Herder, 1963. Edited by Otto Schulmeister, Johann Christoph Allmeyer-Beck and Lessing. OCLC 74355752
  - Freiburg im Breisgau. Austria: Herder, 1967. OCLC 3468261
- 1964 Die Wiener Schatzkammer, Hallwag, Switzerland
- The Voyages of Ulysses
  - 1965 Die Odyssee. Herder, Deutschland
  - 1966 The Voyages of Ulysses. MacMillan, United Kingdom
  - The Adventures of Ulysses: Homer's Epic in Pictures. New York: Dodd Mead, 1970. ISBN 978-0-396-06251-6.
  - 1970 Las Aventuras de Ulises. Herder, Spain
  - 1970 De Avonturen van Odysseus. Becht, The Netherlands
  - 1966 De Odyssee, Becht. The Netherlands
  - 1969 Die Abenteuer des Odysseus. Herder, Deutschland
  - 1969 Odysséen. Allhems Förlag, Sweden.
- 1966 Römisches Erinnerungsbuch (Roman memoirs). Herder, Germany
- 1967 Entdecker des Weltraums (Explorers of outer space). Herder, Germany
- The Story of Noah
  - 1968 Die Arche Noah. Molden, Austria
  - 1968 The Story of Noah. Time Life, USA
  - 1968 Het Verhall van Noach. Elsevier, The Netherlands
  - 1968 Berättelsen om Noa. Norstedt & Söners Förlag, Schweden
- Rome Remembered
  - 1969 Reminiscenze Romane. Edizioni Paoline, Italy
  - 1969 Rome Remembered. Burns & Oates, United Kingdom / Herder & Herder, USA
- 1969 Discoverers of Space. Burns & Oates, United Kingdom / Herder & Herder, USA
- The Bible.
  - 1969 Die Bibel. Die Geschichte Israels und seines Glaubens, Herder, Germany
  - 1969 Verité et Poésie de la Bible (Poetry and Truth of the Bible). Hatier, France
  - 1969 Verità e poesia della Bibbia. Edizioni Paoline, Italy
  - The Bible: History and Culture of a People. A Pictorial narration. Freiburg im Breisgau, Germany: Herder and Herder, 1970. ISBN 978-0-333-12102-3.
- 1969 Deutsche Reise (German Travel). Ein Erinnerungsbuch, Herder, Germany
- 1969 Die Wiener Oper (The Vienna Opera). Molden, Austria
- 1970 Musik in Wien. Molden, Austria
- 1971 Ravenna. Steine reden, Herder, Germany
- 1971 Der Mann aus Galiläa (The Man of Galilee). Herder, Germany
- Jesus. History & Culture Of The New Testament
  - 1971 Jesus. History & Culture Of The New Testament. Herder & Herder, USA
  - 1971 De man van Nazareth. Becht, The Netherlands
- The Spanish Riding School of Vienna
  - 1972 Die Spanische Hofreitschule zu Wien. Molden, Austria
  - 1972 The Spanish Riding School of Vienna. Molden, Austria
  - 1972 La Haute Ecole Espagnole de Vienne. Albin Michel, France
  - 1972 De Spaanse rijschool in Wenen. C.A.J. van Dishoeck, Belgium
- 1973 Traumstraßen durch Deutschland (Dream Roads Germany). Molden, Austria
- 1974 Die K & K Armee (The K & K army). Bertelsmann, Germany.
- 1975 Das Schönste aus der Spanischen Hofreitschule (The best of the Spanish Riding School). Molden, Austria
- 1975 L’Opéra de Paris, Hatier, France
- Deutsche Ritter, Deutsche Burgen. By Lessing and Werner Meyer.
  - Germany: Bertelsmann, 1976.
  - 1999. ISBN 978-3828902824.
- 1976 Gott sprach zu Abraham (God said to Abraham). Herder, Germany.
- 1976 Le Message de l‘Espérance (The Message of Hope). Hatier, France.
- 1977 Die Griechischen Sagen (The Greek Legends), Bertelsmann, Germany
- On The Roads of France
- 1978 Traumstraße Donau (Dream Roads Danube). Molden, Austria.
  - 1978 Traumstraßen durch Frankreich (Dream Roads France), Molden, Austria
  - 1978 Sur Les Routes de France (On The Roads of France), Arthaud, France
- 1978 Die kaiserlichen Kriegsvölker (The Imperial War Peoples), Bertelsmann, Germany
- The Celts
  - 1978 Les Celts, Hatier, France
  - 1979 Die Kelten, Herder, Germany
  - 1979 De Kelten, Standaard Uitgeverij, The Netherlands
- 1979 Ludwig van Beethoven, Herder, Germany
- 1980 Deutsche Schlösser, Deutsche Fürsten, Bertelsmann, Germany
- The Travels of Saint Paul
  - 1980 Paulus, Herder, Germany
  - 1982 Paulus - Der Völkerapostel, Herder, Germany
  - 1980 Les voyages de Saint Paul, Hatier, France
  - 1980 Saint Paul, Becht, The Netherlands
  - 1980 The Travels of Saint Paul, Herder & Herder, USA
- 1980 Hallstatt. Bilder aus der Frühzeit Europas, Jugend & Volk, Austria
- 1980 Hausbibel, Herder, Germany
- 1980 Wolfgang Amadeus Mozart, Herder, Germany
- 1981 Joseph Haydn, Herder, Germany
- Das Heer unter dem Doppeladler (The army under the double-headed eagle). Germany: Bertelsmann, 1981.
- 1982 Die Donau, Ringier, Germany
- 1983 Das Wiener Rathaus, Jugend & Volk, Austria
- The Italian Renaissance
  - 1983 Die Italienische Renaissance, Bertelsmann, Germany
  - 1985 La Renaissance Italienne, Hatier, France
- 1985 Die Niederlande, Bertelsmann, Germany
- 1987 Die Bibel. Das Alte Testament in Bildern erzählt von Erich Lessing (The Bible. The Old Testament narrative in pictures), Bertelsmann, Germany
- 1987 Der Wiener Musikverein, J & V Edition Wien, Austria
- Greece
  - 1987 La Grece, Payot, France
  - 1988 Griechenland, Kohlhammer, Germany
- 1989 Die Geschichte Frankreichs (The History of France), Bertelsmann, Germany
- 1989 Edles Porzellan, Falken, Germany
- Immortal Egypt
  - 1990 Geheimnisvolles Ägypten, Bechtermünz, Germany
  - 1990 Immortelle Egypte, Nathan, France
- 1991 Les mythes grecs, Nathan, France
- Florence and the Renaissance
  - 1992 Florence et la Renaissance, Terrail, France
  - 1993 Florence and the Renaissance, Terrail, France
  - 1993 Florenz und seine Kunst im 15. Jahrhundert, Terrail, France
- Glory of Venice
  - 1993 La Gloire de Venise, Terrail, France
  - 1994 Glory of Venice, Terrail, France
  - 1994 Venedig, Glanz und Glorie, Terrail, France
- 1994 Karl Friedrich Schinkel: An Architecture for Prussia, Rizzoli International, USA
- Femmes mythologies
  - 1994 Femmes mythologies, Imprimerie nationale, France
  - Femmes mythologies. France: Imprimerie nationale, 1994. ISBN 978-2-11-081187-5.
  - 1994 Frauen-Mythologie, Metamorphosis, Germany
- Pomeii
  - 1995 Pompéi, Terrail, France
  - Pomeii Vilo International, 1996. ISBN 978-2-87939-007-9.
  - 2001 Pompeji, Komet, Germany
- 1998 Dieux de l'Egypte (Gods of Egypt), Imprimerie nationale, France
- 2000 Das Heilige Land: Landschaften, Archäologie, Religion, Orbis, Germany
- 2000 Dieu en ses Anges, Cerf, France
- 2000 Rückblende - Geschichten aus der Welt vor 1000 Jahren, Wieser, Austria
- Arresting Time: Erich Lessing, Reportage Photography, 1948-1973
  - 2002 Vom Festhalten der Zeit - Reportage-Fotografie 1948-1973, Brandstätter, Austria
  - 2003 Mémoire du Temps - Photographies de Reportage 1948-1973, Hazan, France
  - Arresting Time: Erich Lessing, Reportage Photography, 1948-1973 by Alistair Crawford. USA: Quantuck Lane, 2005. ISBN 978-1-59372-020-9.
- Louvre - The Arts Face to Face
  - 2003 Au Louvre - Les Arts Face à Face, Hazan, France
  - 2003 Louvre - The Arts Face to Face, Hazan, France
  - 2003 Un Certain Louvre, Biro Éditeur, France
- From Liberation to Liberty
  - 2005 Von der Befreiung zur Freiheit, Verlag der Metamorphosen, Austria
  - 2005 From Liberation to Liberty, Verlag der Metamorphosen, Austria
- 1001 Paintings of the Louvre
  - 2005 1001 peintures du Louvre: De l'Antiquité au XIXe siècle. 5 Continents Editions, Italy / Louvre, France
  - 2006 1001 Gemälde des Louvre. 5 Continents Editions, Italy / Michael Imhof Verlag, Germany
- Revolution in Hungary, The 1956 Budapest Uprising
  - Revolution in Hungary, The 1956 Budapest Uprising. Thames & Hudson, 2006. ISBN 978-0-500-51326-2.
  - 2006 Budapest 1956 - Die Ungarische Revolution, Brandstätter, Austria
  - 2006 Budapest 1956 - la Révolution, Biro Éditeur, France
  - 2006 Budapest 1956 - la rivoluzione, Marietti 1820, Italy
  - 2006 Budapest 1956 - a forradalom, 1956-os Intézet, Hungary
- 2007 Naissance de la figure, Hazan, France
- 2008 Herbert von Karajan, Verlag der Metamorphosen, Austria / Böhlau, Austria
- Joseph Haydn - His Time Told in Pictures
  - 2009 Joseph Haydn - His time told in pictures, Verlag der Metamorphosen, Austria
  - 2009 Joseph Haydn und seine Zeit in Bildern, Verlag der Metamorphosen, Austria / Braumüller, Austria
- 2010 Menschenbilder aus der Dunkelkammer, Verlag Thomas Reche, Germany
- 2011 Václav Havel. Fünfzehn Stimmungen, Verlag Thomas Reche, Germany
- The Louvre - All the paintings
  - 2011 The Louvre - All the paintings. Black Dog & Leventhal, USA
  - 2011 Louvre - Tutti i dipinti, Electra, Italy
  - 2012 Le Louvre - Toutes les peintures, Flammarion / Éditions du Louvre, France
  - 2012 Louvre - Alle Gemälde, Dumont, Germany
- 2014 Anderswo, Nimbus. Kunst und Bücher, Switzerland
- 2014 Von der Befreiung zur Freiheit - Österreich nach 1945, Tyrolia, Austria
- 2015 Ungarn 1956, Tyrolia, Austria

== Awards ==
- 1956: American Art Editors´ Award for his work during the Hungarian Revolution.
- 1966: Prix Nadar for his book The Voyages of Ulysses.
- 1970: Austrian Karl Renner prize for outstanding cultural achievements.
- 1976: Culture-Award of the city of Vienna.
- 1992: Vienna's silver medal for outstanding services to the city.
- 1992: Imre Nagy medal from the President of Hungary for his work during the Hungarian revolution.
- 1997: Golden Medal from the governor of Syria.
- 1997: Austrian State Prize for Photography
- 2013: Austrian Cross of Honor for Science and Art
