= Pierre Berdoy =

French photographer (1936–2025)

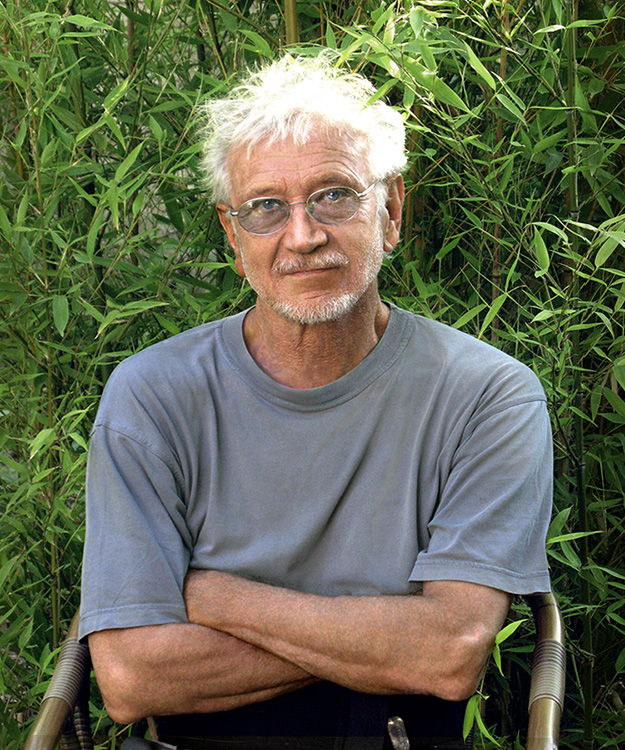
- Berdoy in 2008
- Born: 31 July 1936; Biarritz, France
- Died: 3 October 2025 (aged 89)
- Occupation: Photographer
- Website: pierreberdoy.net

Pierre Berdoy (31 July 1936 – 3 October 2025) was a French photographer of architecture, design, still life and beauty. Winner of the Niépce Prize in 1967, he collaborated on projects with French magazines such as L'ŒIL (1960s), Elle (1970s and 1980s), Madame Figaro (1980s) and other publications until the 2000s.

He first gained professional recognition in 1967 for a series of pictures entitled The life of a fighting bull (La vie du taureau de combat). His still life pictures for magazines then attracted a following during the Back-to-Nature movement of that time. Later he would apply graphic rigour to portraits and female bodies which was successfully received in the beauty pages of magazines.

== Biography ==
Berdoy was born in Biarritz in July 1936. In 1959, he obtained a diploma from the Technical School of Photography and Cinema in Paris (ETPC, École Technique de Photographie et de Cinématographie) now the Photography Department of the École nationale supérieure Louis-Lumière.

In 1960 he married Dorine Bertrand, a classmate who graduated in the same year as he did. They have a son, Manuel Berdoy, a specialist in animal behaviour at the University of Oxford, England. During the 12 years of their marriage, Pierre and Dorine Berdoy would also have a rewarding professional partnership.

Pierre Berdoy started his career by filling orders from architects. From 1962 to 1967 he covered many assignments on architecture and interior design, mainly in Europe, for the review L'ŒIL run by Rosamond and Georges Bernier. Robert Delpire was the art director. Among the missions were the Peter Harnden house in Spain; an apartment designed by André Monpoix in France; the Villa Mairea in Finland designed by Alvar Aalto in 1937; Mr and Mrs Urvater’s house-museum by André Jacqmain in Belgium; York Castle for Yves Vidal in Morocco; the architect André Wogenscky's house in France; other houses decorated by David Nightingale Hicks in the United Kingdom; Mario Praz’s place at the Ricci Palace in Italy, etc.

In addition to architecture, he photographed young designers’ work such as Djinn seating by Olivier Mourgue, the bridge table by Terence Conran and fabrics by Placide Joliet. He immortalised the new Élysée lounges designed by Pierre Paulin and The National Furniture (Mobilier National) for the French President Georges Pompidou.

In 1967, Pierre and Dorine Berdoy were awarded the Niépce Prize for two photo essays:

- The life of a fighting bull (La vie du taureau de combat) by Pierre Berdoy, for which the pictures were taken on Álvaro Domecq y Diez and Antonio Ordonez’s farms in Andalusia (Spain), and on Hubert Yonnet’s farm in the Camargue (France);
- Portraits of Pop Art painters (Portraits de peintres liés au Pop Art) by Dorine and Pierre in New York. It was after a meeting with gallery owner Leo Castelli that they photographed Robert Rauschenberg, James Rosenquist, Roy Lichtenstein, Claes Oldenburg, Lee Bontecou, Richard Lindner among others.

Two exhibitions followed: Trends in young French photography (Tendances de la jeune photographie française) at the French National Library (Bibliothèque Nationale de France) and Design and bulls (Design et Taureaux) at the Asko-Roche Bobois space in Paris. For Design and bulls, which had its inaugural showing in October 1967, Pierre Berdoy took a series of pictures around the Ball Chair, created two years earlier by the Finnish designer Eero Aarnio.

From 1967 to 1974, Pierre Berdoy's work was devoted to Elle magazine. He found great creative freedom collaborating with Jacqueline Chaumont, manager of the Interior design pages. The following are a few examples of his work at that time:

- Numerous series of pictures in a mimetic confrontation of objects and nature.
- A Christmas tale; a photo-story in a Roland Topor scenario, photographed at the Glacier Blanc in the French Alps.
- A photo essay in Alsace at the writer and visual artist Claudie Hunzinger and her husband Francis Hunzinger’s home when the book Bambois, la vie verte was published.

The postscript to the meeting with the Hunzingers would take place in 1983 when the association, Image and Creation (Image et Création), organised a collective exhibition where Pierre Berdoy presented large black and white prints entitled "Empreintes dans la neige" (Tracks in the snow) confronting charred writings by Claudie Hunzinger.

In 1971, the Ivory Coast government launched a scientific expedition in the Taï forest to take an inventory of the fauna and flora, for which Pierre Berdoy was the official photographer. The Taï National Park was created the following year.

At Elle magazine, he left the Interior design pages for the Beauty pages.

In 1984, Pierre Berdoy joined Madame Figaro magazine for which Martin Schmollgrüber had just become the Art Director. Pin-Up studio in Paris became his headquarters. He designed covers and hundreds of pages for the magazine; close-up pictures, fragmented faces and bodies as well as jewellery and beauty products, with the same obsession for detail. This technique is his signature. His collaboration with Madame Figaro came to an end with the sudden passing of M. Schmollgrüber in 1991 at the age of 44.

In 1988 Pierre Berdoy joined Trademarc photographers’ agency, managed by Marc Pussemier. He did extensive advertising photography including the Yves Saint Laurent Dress your lips (Habillez vos lèvres) campaign for its lipstick which won the French Grand Prix for posters (Grand Prix de l'Affiche française) in 1992.

During the 1990s, he photographed beauty and still life for the editorial pages of Elle, Jardin des Modes, L'Officiel and Votre Beauté.

In 1992, the French National Archaeological Museum (Musée d'Archéologie nationale) celebrated the centenary of the discovery of Venus of Brassempouy by Edouard Piette. Pierre Berdoy exhibited his portraits of the mammoth ivory statuette, for once paying homage to an Upper Palaeolithic beauty.

In 2002, Pierre Berdoy moved away from Paris and returned to his native town Biarritz and established his archives and studio where he devoted his time to personal photography.
