= Marc Garanger =

French photographer (1935–2020)

Marc Garanger (May 2, 1935 – April 28, 2020) was a French photographer.

== Life ==
Garanger was born in 1935 in Ézy-sur-Eure, France and died on April 28, 2020, just six days before his 85th birthday.

== Career ==
He was most famous for his portraits of Algerian women in the 1960s, where female prisoners were forced to remove their veils and were photographed by him against their will. He was a winner of the 1966 Niépce Prize in photography.
