= Fulvio Roiter =

Italian photographer (1926–2016)

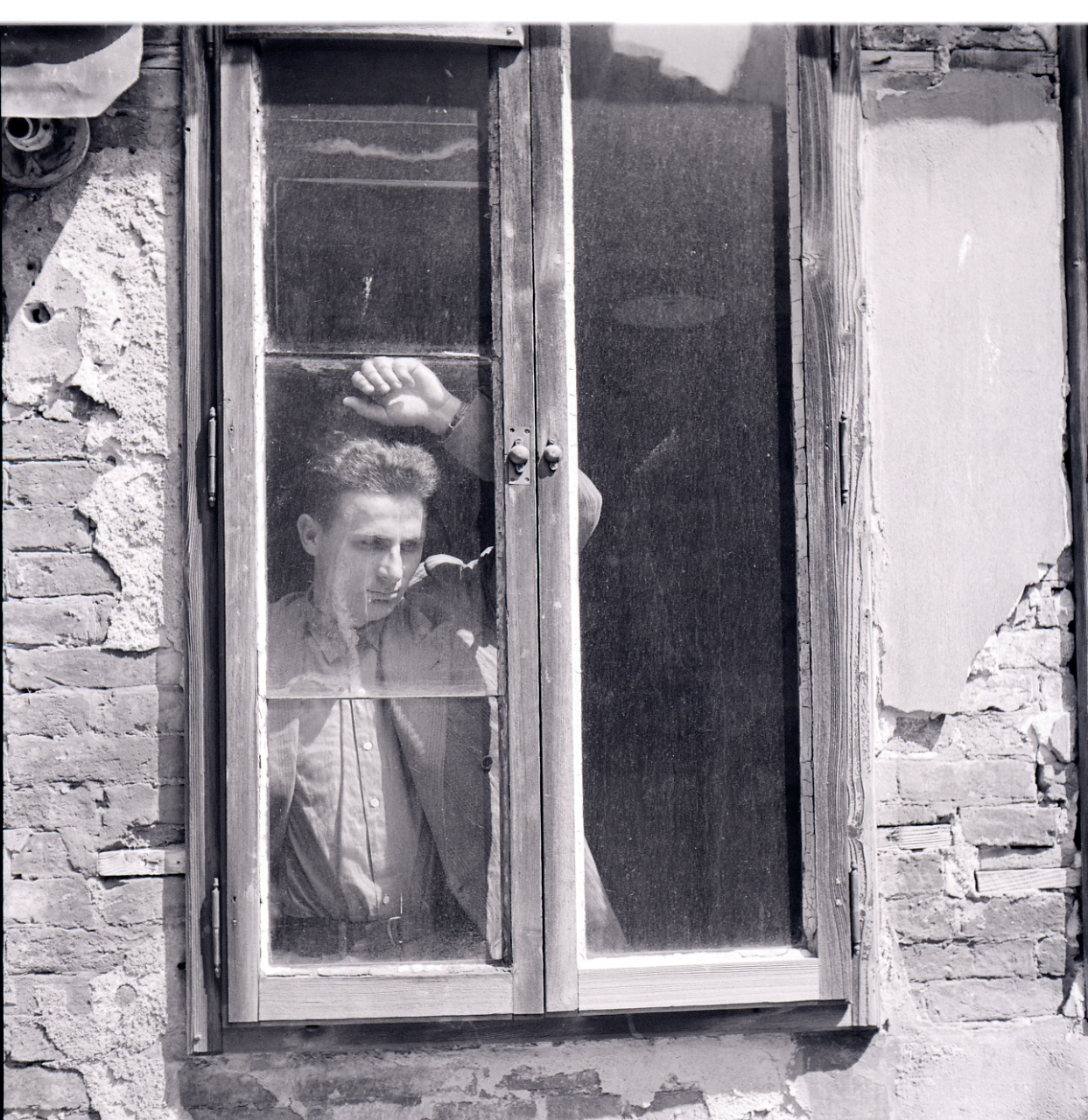
- Fulvio Roiter photographed by Paolo Monti in 1953
- Born: 1 November 1926; Meolo, Italy
- Died: 18 April 2016 (aged 89); Venice, Italy
- Occupation: Photographer

Fulvio Roiter (1 November 1926 – 18 April 2016) was an Italian photographer.

== Biography ==
Born in Meolo, Venice, Roiter graduated as a chemist, but from 1947 he devoted himself to photography, being professionally active since 1953. After several reportages for some magazines, in 1954 he published his first photographic book, Venise a fleur d'eau. In 1956 Roiter won the second edition of the Prix Nadar with the book Ombrie. Terre de Saint-François.

During his career, Roiter released about one hundred photographic books. After his death, his daughter Jessica decided to establish a foundation to preserve and promote the photographer's artistic legacy. The Fulvio Roiter Foundation has the task of disseminating and promoting the works that tell the story of a life dedicated to photography, as well as rediscovering Roiter's works and his unpublished works.
