= Valérie Jouve =

French photographer and filmmaker

Valérie Jouve (born December 27, 1964, in Saint-Étienne, France) is a contemporary French photographer, video artist, and film director.

== Biography ==
After studying anthropology, Valérie Jouve began pursuing a career as a photographer. Her work refers as much to contemporary art as it does to the fields of anthropology, sociology, and narrative reporting. By photographing "played" or "performed" images, she revels the daily theatrical aspects of contemporary society.

Since 1995, Valérie Jouve has exhibited her photography most notably at the galerie Anne de Villepoix. In September 2006, she had her first exhibition at the Galerie Xippas in Paris. Her exhibition En attente was presented at the Centre Georges Pompidou in 2010. She had a major survey in 2015 at the Galerie nationale du Jeu de Paume.

As a film director, she made her first movie, Grand Littoral, in 2003, which won the Prix Georges de Beauregard National at the Marseille Festival of Documentary Film. In 2006, she directed Time is Working around Rotterdam.

She received the prix Niépce in 2013. Jouve was named a knight of the Ordre des Arts et des Lettres in 2011.

== Bibliography ==
- Jouve, Valérie (2003), Ateliers d'Artistes de la ville de Marseille (ed.), Grand littoral (in French), Marseille, p. 61, ISBN 2911748182
- Valérie Jouve, exhibition, March 4-April 20, 1998, Centre national de la photographie; catalogue, ed. Michel Poivert, Centre national de la photographie, Arles, Actes Sud, 1998. ISBN 978-2867541148
- Valérie Jouve, exhibition, June 23-September 13, 2010, Centre Pompidou; catalogue, ed. Quentin Bajac, éditions du Centre Pompidou, Paris, 2010, 96 p.
- Valérie Jouve, Résonances, Göttingen, Steidl, 2010, 240 p.
- Ceci n'est pas un parc, éditions Libel, Lyon, 2010.
- Valérie Jouve, by Dean Inkster; Paris, Hazan, 2002.
- Valérie Jouve: Corps en résistance, exhibition, June 2-September 27, 2015, Jeu de Paume; November 5, 2015 – January 17, 2016, La Corogne, la Fundación Luis Seoane; catalogue, ed. Marta Gili and Pia Viewing, Jeu de Paume, Paris, 2015.
- "The spaces of containment: Valérie Jouve's urban portraits," by Olga Smith, Nottingham French Studies, 2014, p. 155-168.
