= Christian Caujolle =

French journalist and photographer (1953–2025)

Christian Caujolle (26 February 1953 – 20 October 2025) was a French journalist, photo agent, curator and photographer. He was one of the founders and the artistic director of the Agence VU, as well as the artistic director of the Galerie VU created in 1998. He was the artistic director of the Photo Phnom Penh festival (Cambodia), and of the Château d'Eau gallery in Toulouse.

== Life and career ==
Caujolle was born in Sissonne on 26 February 1953. He studied in Toulouse, where a monograph on Jean Dieuzaide introduced him to photography.

He was a student of the École Normale Supérieure de Saint-Cloud, class of 1974 (Letters - Spanish), and student and collaborator of Michel Foucault, Roland Barthes, and Pierre Bourdieu. He was a researcher at the CNRS from 1978 and a contributor to Liberation as a journalist and photography critic, then in 1981 editor-in-chief in charge of photography and produced issues dedicated to Jean-Paul Sartre and Jean Cocteau.

In 1986 he created Agence VU, a photography agency and after directing the 1997 Rencontres Internationales de la Photographie d’Arles, was appointed director of the Photographic Gallery VU from 1998. From 2000 he was curator of significant exhibitions and festivals including Foto Biennale in Rotterdam (2000); PHotoEspaña Festival where he presented young Iranian photographers and Thai and Anglo-Saxon photographers based in Bangkok (2001) later presented at the DG Bank collection at the Kunsthalle in Frankfurt; S. and P. Stanikas installation at the Lithuanian Pavilion at the Venice Biennale (2003); Hors Cadre by Gérard Rondeau, at the Grand Palais (Paris) and 50 years of World Press Photo - Things As They Are, photojournalism in context 1955 - 2005, which toured Amsterdam, Tokyo, Paris, and Seoul in 2001; and Phnom Penh Photo Festival (2008). He served on the judging panel for the 2015 Leica Oskar Barnack Award (LOBA).

On 16 November 2020, Christian Caujolle was appointed artistic advisor to the Galerie du Château d'Eau de Toulouse.

On the rise of digital imagery shared via social media in relation to the profession of photography he said;

In the world of image in which we are immersed, there are more and more producers of undifferentiated images, who are ultimately equivalent. And it is a popular production, but it has become illegible because of its mass. For this reason, I think that these image producers may not be photographers at all. In fact, I believe that digital imagery is today exactly in the situation in which photography was in its invention: when photography was invented, the only visual references on which it relied were painting, drawing and architecture. Today, digital image producers have as a reference the history of photography. They therefore produce clichés - since they are clichés, stereotypes - that echo pre-existing photographic images. At the same time, and this is one of the very positive aspects of the development of digital technologies, saying today "I am a photographer" is a real choice: it is a very important statement, since it affirms, it defends the fact that the operator has decided to use a technology that involves a certain type of relationship to reality, a certain manufacture of temporality that is totally different.

Caujolle died on 20 October 2025, at the age of 72.

== Publications ==
- Caujolle (2013). Post scriptum. Christer Strömholm. Stockholm: Max Ström, Bokförlaget. ISBN 978-91-7126-249-3. OCLC 833341000.
- Gentili, Moreno; Caujolle, Christian; Valtorta, Roberta (1998). Nuovo mondo, mondo nuovo : metamorfosi delle tecnologie. Milano: Charta. ISBN 88-8158-186-8. OCLC 40232299.
- PhotoPhnomPenh 5 ans. Christian Caujolle, Institut français du Cambodge. [Phnom Penh]: Institut français. 2012. ISBN 978-2-35137-145-9. OCLC 866572858.
- Petersen, Anders (2014). Anders Petersen. Christian Caujolle. New York, New York. ISBN 978-0-500-41108-7. OCLC 874836976.
- Caujolle, Christian (2007). Things as they are : [photojournalism in context since 1955]. Mary Panzer, Christian Caujolle, Foam Fotografiemuseum (1st pbk. Aperture ed.). New York: Aperture Foundation. ISBN 978-1-59711-036-5. OCLC 153577738.
- Landskrona Foto view : Chile : from history to stories = desde la historia a historias. Christian Caujolle, Rodrigo Gómez Rovira, Catalina Mena, Samuel Salgado T., Jorge Brantmayer, Landskrona museum. Landskrona: Landskrona Foto. 2018. ISBN 978-91-984414-2-0. OCLC 1050514344.
- Sète #17. Christian Caujolle. Marseille. 2017. ISBN 978-2-36744-112-2. OCLC 990926292.
- Chamorro, Koldo (2020). Koldo Chamorro : el Santo Christo Ibérico. Clemente Bernad, Margarita Ledo Andión, Christian Caujolle, Philip Sutton, Roberto López Montero, Museo de Navarra, Museo Lázaro Galdiano. Madrid. ISBN 978-84-17769-32-1. OCLC 1187187242.
- Bas, José Ramón. (2009). La voz del viajero. Christian Caujolle. Madrid: La Fábrica. ISBN 978-84-92498-69-7. OCLC 421363111.
- Ackerman, Michael; Caujolle, Christian (1999). End time city (1st Scalo ed.). Zurich: Scalo. ISBN 3-908247-13-6. OCLC 41338370.
- Caujolle, Christian (2001). Joan Fontcuberta. Joan Fontcuberta. London: Phaidon. ISBN 0-7148-4031-9. OCLC 45648294.
- Place du Châtelain; Caujolle, Christian; Dumont, Delphine; de Spoelberch, Rodolphe (2020). The world within (First ed.). Brussels, Belgium. ISBN 978-2-9602519-1-3. OCLC 1252059869.
- Rimondi, Giulio (2016). Italiana. Christian Caujolle, Kehrer Verlag. Heidelberg. ISBN 978-3-86828-718-9. OCLC 971134137.
- Madoz, Chema (1999). Chema Madoz. Christian Caujolle. Paris: Assouline. ISBN 2-84323-154-X. OCLC 41466663.
- Beard, Peter H. (1997). Peter Beard. Christian Caujolle, Centre national de la photographie (2. éd ed.). Paris: Nathan. ISBN 9782097541079. OCLC 1311043684.
- Berger, Hans Georg (2000). Het bun dai bun : Laos : sacred rituals of Luang Prabang. Christian Caujolle. London: Westzone. ISBN 1-903391-02-4. OCLC 47226223.
- Photographies contemporaines, points de vue. Fondation HSBC pour la photographie. Paris: Textuel. 2006. ISBN 2-84597-209-1. OCLC 300529952.
- Ordos : stillborn city. Christian Caujolle, Gabriel Grésillon, Hudson Lockett, R. Muller, Adrien Golinelli. Heidelberg. 2016. ISBN 978-3-86828-638-0. OCLC 956337453.
- Moser, Albert (2012). Albert Moser : life as a panoramic. Christian Berst, Philip March Jones, André Rouillé, Christian Caujolle, Galerie Christian Berst. Paris: Galerie Christian Berst. ISBN 978-2-36669-002-6. OCLC 846549200.
- Greene, Stanley (2003). Open wound : Chechnya 1994 to 2003. André Glucksmann, Christian Caujolle. [London]: Trolley. ISBN 1-904563-01-5. OCLC 52565574.
- Beard, Peter H.; Caujolle, Christian; Tunney, Peter T. (1999). Peter Beard : fifty years of portraits (1st ed.). Sante Fe, N.M.: Arena Editions. ISBN 1-892041-15-4. OCLC 42585037.
- Klein, William (1985). William Klein. Christian,. Caujolle. Paris: Centre national de la photographie. ISBN 2-86754-023-2. OCLC 489805097.
- City night light. Philong Sovan, Christian Caujolle. [Marseille]. 2022. ISBN 978-2-36744-169-6. OCLC 1334735186.
- Johansson, Simon; Flemming, Gösta; Caujolle, Christian (2016). Simon Johansson : across the bridge (1st ed.). Stockholm: Journal. ISBN 978-91-87939-17-4. OCLC 967833195.
- Wasif, Munem, ...; Caujolle, Christian (2013). Belonging. Paris: C. de La Féronnière. ISBN 978-2-9542266-1-3. OCLC 859448878.
- Lassée, Floriane de; Caujolle, Christian (2022). Inside views. [Paris]: Le Caillou Bleu - Editions. ISBN 978-2-490952-26-7. OCLC 1374119195.
- Petersen, Anders; Caujolle, Christian (2013). Anders Petersen. [Roquevaire: A. Frère. ISBN 979-10-92265-10-1. OCLC 870259505.
- Tractor boys. Christian Caujolle, Martin Bogren. Stockport. 2013. ISBN 978-1-907893-35-3. OCLC 830354246.
- Caujolle, Christian (1996). Labours. Jean-Luc Chapin. Cognac: Le Temps qu'il fait. ISBN 2-86853-245-4. OCLC 38041571.
- Doury, Claudine; Caujolle, Christian; McWhorter, Melanie (2011). Sasha. Brussels: Le Caillou Bleu - Editions. ISBN 978-2-930537-11-5. OCLC 855115140.
- Muñoz, Isabel; Boesch, Jacques; Caujolle, Christian (1994). Fragments. Arles: Actes Sud. ISBN 2-7427-0360-8. OCLC 464076117.
- Agata, Antoine d'; Caujolle, Christian; Le Dantec, Bruno (2003). Insomnia. Marseille: Images en manœuvres. ISBN 2-908445-75-1. OCLC 53177762.
- Caujolle, Christian; De Luca, Erri; Jones, Julie; Maison rouge-Fondation Antoine de Galbert (2017). Étranger résident : la collection Marin Karmitz. [Lyon]: Fage éditions. ISBN 978-2-84975-467-2. OCLC 1011556153.
- Tirafkan, Sadegh; Shayegan, Darius; Caujolle, Christian (2005). Sadegh Tirafkan : Iranian man. Bruxelles: La lettre volée. ISBN 2-87317-281-9. OCLC 68619863.
- Bovet, Emmanuel; Caujolle, Christian (2015). East stream : un road trip au fil du Danube. Trézélan: Filigranes éditions. ISBN 978-2-35046-327-8. OCLC 920035881.
- Delafontaine, Léo; Caujolle, Christian; Morgensztern, Isy; Photaumnales, Diaphane (2011). D'Abraham. Montreuil-sur-Brèche: Diaphane éd. ISBN 978-2-919077-06-9. OCLC 780295091.
- Beasley, Juliana, ...; Caujolle, Christian (2010). Sète #10. Sète: CéTaVoir. ISBN 978-2-84995-173-6. OCLC 810635254.
- Culmann, Olivier; Caujolle, Christian; Cheval, François; Pinney, Christopher; Musée Nicéphore Niépce (2015). Olivier Culmann : the others. Paris: Éditions Xavier Barral. ISBN 978-2-36511-080-8. OCLC 927159654.

== Awards ==
- 2010: Officier de l'ordre des Arts et des Lettres
