= Edward Alcock =

Edward Alcock may refer to:

- Edward Alcock (artist) (fl. 1745–1778), English painter of portraits and miniatures
- Edward Alcock (footballer) (1914–1939), English footballer for Tranmere Rovers and Congleton Town
