= Jean-Christian Bourcart =

French photographer

Jean-Christian Bourcart (born 1960) is a French artistic photographer and film maker. He collected unsold wedding pictures, photographed in brothels and S&M cubs, photographed New Yorkers stuck in traffic jams, projected pictures of Iraqi victims on American houses, churches and supermarkets, wrote and published his autobiography and documented lengthy the city of Camden, NJ, one of the poorest and most dangerous city in the USA. He also directed two fiction feature movies, the first one during the war in Bosnia, the second, a sci-fi thriller in New York art world, starring the awards-winner Elodie Bouchez. He is also an active video filmmaker. Nine books about his work have been published. He has been teaching and conducting workshops all along his career. In 2021, all his archives were deposited at the musée Nicephore Niepce in Chalon-sur-Saône in France.

Awards: Nadar Prize, Paris, 2011 Nominated for Pictet prize 2010 & 2011, ICP awards 2010, BMW award 2010 Niepce Prize, Paris 2010 Prix du du Jeu de Paume, Paris, 2006 Prix Gilles Dusein, Paris, 1999 Prix d’interprétation masculine, “Premiers Plans,” Festival de Belfort,1997 Prix du Jury, Festival d’Annecy 1997 World Press Awards, categorie Art, Amsterdam, 1991 Prix Polaroïd, 1984

== Solo exhibitions (selection) ==
2021 "Au bord du reél," Fondation M.R.O, Arles "F.S.A., l'inconscient de Roy Stryker," 8 Belze, Arles 2020 "Black Sheet," Manifesto Festival, Toulouse 2019 "L'oiseau noir perché à droite dans ma tête", Fisheye Galerie, Paris 2018 "Une excuse pour regarder," Musée Nicéphore Nièpce, Chalon sur Saône 2017 "Day of Wrath, " Fisheye Gallery, Paris, France
"Humano Todavia," Valenzuela Klenner Gallery, Bogota, Colombia
"Camden," Chongqing festival, China
2016 "Camden," International Photographic festival, Chengzhou, China
"The dawn came but no day", Festival "Portraits," Vichy
"Camden," International Photographic festival, Zhengzhou, China

2015 "All about Love," galerie VU', Paris

2014 "All about Love," Black Box Gallery, Brooklyn, USA

2013 ‘’Camden," Invisible Dog Art center, Brooklyn, USA

"Exerts,"Roger Williams University, Bristol, USA " Tana," French Institute, Antananarivo, Madagascar

- 2012 Shanghai Gallery of Art, China

Galerie Le Manège, Institut français, Dakar, Sénégal Caochangdi PhotoSpring, Beijing, China Le bleu du ciel Art Center, Lyon, France

- 2011‘’Kailash," Galerie VU’, Paris

Galerie Confluence, Nantes ‘’Kailash," Hôtel Fontfreyde, Clermont Ferrand Images - Festival des arts visuels de Vevey

- 2010 "Camden", Museum für Photographie Braunschweig
- "10th International photo Exhibition," Shanghai
- "Camden", Images - Festival des arts visuels de Vevey
- 2009: "Camden", Rencontres Internationales d’Arles
- 2008: "Le plus beau jour de la vie," Rencontres Internationales d’Arles
- 2007: "Stardust", Andrea Meislin Gallery, New York; Musée du Jeu de Paume, Paris; "Stardust," Chrysler Museum, Norfolk,
- 2006: "Traffic," Museu da Imagem, Braga, Portugal
- 2006: "Traffic", Fototeca, Monterrey, Mexico
- 2004: "Traffic", Galerie Léo Scheer, Paris
- 2002: "Le plus beau jour de la vie", Kagan Martos Gallery, New York
- 2001: "Forbidden city", galerie Catherine Bastide, Bruxelles
- 2000: Galerie du Jour, Paris
- 1993: "Les filles de la gare centrale," Galerie Urbi & Orbi, Paris

== Filmography ==
- 2017: "KLCK28," HDV, 3min40
- 2016: "Take my money," HDV 3min15
- 2015: "Tahrir Square/Unspeakable", HDV, 8min 34, CrossEyed Production
- 2011: "Fortune Tellers," HDV, 12min, CrossEyed Production
- 2010: "Memories of the days to come" 35mm, 80 min, Le Bureau production
- 2008: "Encore une fois," DV, 4 min. 30
- 2007: "Stardust, the film," DV, 1 min. 30
- 2006: "Me, my cell and I’," DV, 9 min
- 2005: "It’s today", DV, 7 min; "The decisive act," DV, 8 min. 30; "Stories of hell," DV, 6 min. 15
- 2004: "Rapture," DV, 10 min. 30; "Bardo/Autoportrait," DV, 5min. 15
- 2003: "Videhole," DV, 2 min. 30
- 1999: "(de) la fenêtre," vidéo, 26 min D.A.P, Ministère de la Culture et de la Communication
- 1997: "Elvis," fiction movie, 35 mm, 65 min, Lazennec Production
- 1996: "Céline en galère," video, 46 min, Io Production
- 1993: "Casablanca," video with Robert Frank, 8 min
- 1992: "Les filles de la gare centrale," vidéo, 12 min

== Bibliography ==
1. Monographies 2019 "L'oiseau noir perché à droite dans ma tête," éditions Le Bec en l'air

- 2014 "All About Love," Loco editions Paris, Bizarre éditions New York
- 2011 "Camden," Images en Manœuvre éditions
- 2008 "Sinon la mort te gagnait", Point du jour éditions
- 2004 "Traffic", Leo Scheer editions, interview by Brigitte Ollier
- 2002 "Madones Infertiles," text by Nan Goldin, TDM édition
- 1999 "Forbidden City," text by Régis Jauffret, interview by Brigitte Ollier, Le point du jour éditeur
- 1998 "C’était cinq heures du soir," text by Jean Rolin, Le point du jour éditeur

2. Periodicals

- ‘’Le goncourt de la photo‘’ in La dépêche du midi, January 2012
- "Kailash,‘’ by Dominique Baqué in Art Press, September 2011
- ‘’Kailash‘’, in l’Humanite, p.19, May 2011
- ‘’Kailash‘’, in Le Monde, P.43, April 2011
- ‘’The Most Beautiful Day, ‘’ in British journal of Photography, P.46-53, March 2011
- "Camden, USA," in Usbeck &Rica, p. 54-65, winter 2010
- "Traffic," in Zoom, by Cristina Franzoni, p. 102-104
- "Photographier la misère comme un exorcisme," by Armelle Canitrot in La Croix, p. 14, August 17, 2009
- "Sinon la mort," by Jacques Henric in Artpress nº351, p 74, December 2008
- "J’aime franchir les frontières", Interview in "le Monde", July 12, 2008
- "Collateral," in Esquire, Russia, Dec. 2007
- "Stardust," by Robert Stevens in Next Level, Spring 2007
- "Jean-Christian Bourcart, images violentes", by Hélène Simon in Le Monde, May 4, 2007
- "Qu’est-ce que la photographie aujourd’hui ?", by Brigitte Ollier in Beaux Arts éditions p. 62-63, May 2007
- "Stardust," by Vince Aletti in The New Yorker, February 19 & 27, 2007
- "Se raconter que tout est illusion," interview by Frédéric Bonnet in Le Journal des Arts, Dec. 1, 2007

== Prizes ==
- 2011 Nadar prize for best photographic book for Camden
- 2010 Niépce Prize, Paris
- 2006 Prix du du Jeu de Paume, Paris
- 1999 Prix Gilles Dusein, Paris
- 1997 Prix d’interprétation masculine, "Premiers Plans," Festival de Belfort
- 1997 Prix du Jury, Festival d’Annecy
- 1991 World Press Awards, categorie Art, Amsterdam
- 1984 Prix Polaroïd
