= Jean Dieuzaide =

French photographer

- Born: 20 June 1921; Grenade, Haute-Garonne, France
- Died: 18 September 2003 (aged 82); Toulouse, France
- Other name: Yan
- Occupation: Photographer
- Known for: Galerie du Château d'eau, Toulouse

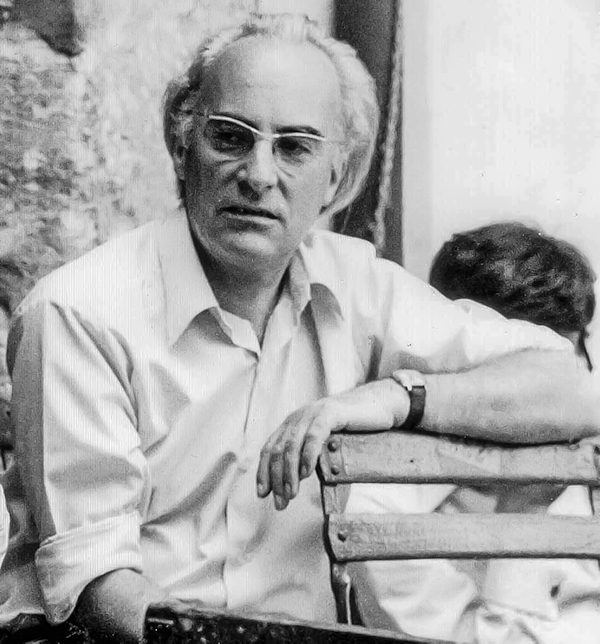
French photographer Jean Dieuzaide photographed at Arles in 1975

Jean Dieuzaide (20 June 1921 – 18 September 2003) was a French photographer.

== Early life and education ==
Dieuzaide was born on 20 June 1921 in Grenade, Haute-Garonne, and at 13 was given a cardboard Coronet 6 × 9 camera. He attended secondary schools in Toulouse, Bordeaux, Cannes and Nice and during WW2 he photographed while in training camps in 1942 and documented young people in Provence. From this period, he signed much of his work ‘Yan’, his Resistance nickname, out of a concern that photography might not be a respectable occupation. On the liberation of Toulouse he decided to make photography his vocation.

== Career ==
Commissioned in 1944 to produce documentary work by the Presidence du Conseil, Dieuzaide set up his first studio and made one of the first portraits of General de Gaulle.In 1946 following his exhibition at the Salon de la Bibliothèque National Editions Arthaud hired him to produce La Gascogne.

His son Michel, also a photographer, was born 11 December 1951.

He is famous for his 1951 portrayal of Salvador Dalí swimming at Cadaqués, his moustache decorated with daisies, and for the 1954 Life magazine assignment to photograph a tightrope walker couple's wedding for which he climbed astride the shoulders of one of the performers. He was profiled in 1964 in a television profile Chambre Noire by M. Tournier.

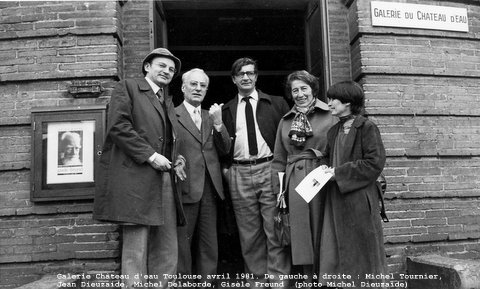
Galerie Château d'eau Toulouse, April 1981. From left to right: Michel Tournier, Jean Dieuzaide, Michel Delaborde, Gisèle Freund (photo Michel Dieuzaide)

Dieuzaide was a photographer in the French Humanist style and a member of Le Groupe des XV, and later of Les 30 x 40, and was the founder of the group 'Libre Expression', also practicing abstraction. Though Dieuzaide began as a photojournalist it was his travel and architectural photography that appeared in books from the 1950s. In the seventies he created the famous French gallery Le château d’eau, pôle photographique de Toulouse in an old water tower and dominated the photographic culture of the city of Toulouse in south-west France for over two decades.

== Solo exhibitions ==
- 1946 Salon de la Bibliotheque Nationale, Paris
- 1948 Club de la Publicite, Paris
- 1952 Inter-Club, Toulouse . Photokina, Koln
- 1958 Galerie d'Orsay, Paris
- 1961 Musee, Sete
- 1962 Galerie Imagen y Sonido, Barcelona
- 1962 Pavilion de Marsan, Louvre, Paris (touring)
- 1963 Musee, Tel Aviv
- 1968 Maison des Quatre Vents, Paris . Fiat, Torino
- 1969 Festival, Avignon L'Oeil ecoute
- 1969 Exposition Universelle, Montreal
- 1970 Musee Reattu, Aries «Le Bestiaire de Maiorque»
- 1977 Musee N. Niepce, Chalon-sur-Saône
- 1978 Galerij Paule Pia, Antwerpen
- 1981 Photographers' Gallery, London
- 1981 Portfolio, Lausanne. Galerie Le Trepied, Geneve.
- 1983 Fondation Nationale de la Photographie, Lyon .
- 1983 FNAC-Etoile, Paris . Musee d'Art Contemporain,
- 1983 Centre Georges Pompidou . Reykjavik
- 1984 Galerie Nei Liicht, Luxembourg

== Publications ==
- 1953 St Sernin de Toulouse, ed. Bourguignon
- 1953 L'Espagne du Sud
- 1955, L'Espagne
- 1955 Le Pays Basque
- 1956 Le Portugal
- 1956 Images d'Alsace
- 1957 La Sardaigne
- 1958 Bearn-Bigorre
- 1958 Suisse romane
- 1958 Roussillon roman
- 1959 Tresors de la Turquie (published also in Great Britain and Germany)
- 1959 Ouercv roman
- 1961 Toulouse et le Haut-Languedoc
- 1961 Histoire de Toulouse
- 1961 Peregrinaciones romanicas, ed. Espagnoles, Barcelona
- 1962 Espagne Romane, editions Braun (Austria and Spain)
- 1962 Rouergue Roman
- 1962 Voix et Images de Toulouse
- 1965 Sainte de Conques, Ed. Zodiaque
- 1967, El Movimiento romanico en Espana
- 1974 Toulouse, Cite du Destin, Ed. Havas
- 1974 Mon Aventure avec le Brai, Dieuzaide.
- 1978, J. Dieuzaide, Ed. Université Toulouse-Mirail
- 1979 Dialogue avec la Lumiere, C.C.F., Toulouse
- 1983 Voyage en Iberie, ContreJour

== Awards ==
- 1951 First Prize for sports photography.
- 1951 French Cup for portraiture (FIAP).
- 1952 sixth prize in Popular Photography contest
- 1955 first to be awarded the Niépce Prize
- 1956 First Prize, international tourism color poster show, New Delhi
- 1957 Edouard Belin medal (FIAP)
- 1959 First Prize, national tourism colour poster, Paris
- 1961 Nadar Prize for the book «Catalogne Romane» (Gens d'lmages)
- 1966 Chevalier, Order of Merit. Member of the Commission des Sites of Haute-Garonne
- 1967 France Cup for landscapes (FIAP)
- 1969 Lucien Lorelle Cup (Bordeaux).
- 1969 Honorary member, French Federation of Photographic Art
- 1970 president, FIAP art committee
- 1971 produces «Les Centrichimigrammes»
- 1973 Radioscopie broadcast, J. Chancel
- 1974 creates the Chiiteau d'Eau Municipal Gallery at Toulouse
- 1975 first photographer to be admitted «marine painter». Member of the S.F.P. and the R.I.P. (F)
- 1976 opens the Jean Dieuzaide Gallery in Toulouse. President of the National Association of Photographers, Reporters and Illustrators
- 1979 Clemence lsaure Prize and Prix des Metiers d'Art (Midi-Pyrenees)
- 1981 Officier: Order of Merit and Order of Arts and Literature.

== Management of Jean Dieuzaide's photo collection ==
Dieuzaide died on 18 September 2003 at his home 7, rue Erasme, Toulouse, France. Jean Dieuzaide's photographs were for the largest part given in September 2016 to Toulouse city, which keeps, classifies, scans and promotes the collection.
