= Claudine (given name) =

Claudine is a given name of French origin. It is the feminine form of the ancient Roman name Claudius. In the United States, the name was considered on the verge of extinction by 2013.

People with this name include:

- Claudine Andre (born 1946), Belgian naturalist
- Claudine Arnaud (1940–2017), Belgian opera singer
- Claudine Auger (1941–2019), French actress
- Claudine Barretto (born 1979), Filipino actress
- Claudine Bautista-Lim (born 1985), Filipino politician
- Claudine Beccarie (born 1945), French pornographic actress
- Claudine Beckford (born 1988), American cricketer
- Claudine Bertrand (born 1948), Canadian educator and poet
- Claudine Bouché (1925–2014), French film editor
- Claudine Bouzonnet-Stella (1636–1697), French artist
- Claudine de Brosse, duchess consort of Savoy
- Claudine K. Brown (1949–2016), American museum director and educator and nonprofit executive
- Claudine Brunand (1630–1674), French engraver
- Claudine Burnham, American politician
- Claudine Cassereau (1953–2020), French model and artist
- Claudine Chatel (born 1951), Canadian actress
- Claudine Chomat (1915–1995), French activist
- Claudine Clark (born 1941), American musician
- Claudine Co (born 1998), Filipino singer and influencer
- Claudine Collins (born 1968), English businesswoman
- Claudine le Comte (born 1950), Belgian fencer
- Claudine de Culam (died 1601), French zoophile
- Claudine Dauphin, French archaeologist and Byzantinist
- Claudine Doury (born 1959), French photographer
- Claudine Douville, Canadian sports journalist, writer and television presenter
- Claudine Dupuis (1930–1991), French actress
- Claudine Emonet (born 1962), French alpine skier
- Claudine Escoffier-Lambiotte (1923–1996), Belgian medical doctor and journalist
- Claudine Françoise Mignot (1624–1711), French adventuress
- Claudine Gay (born 1970), American political scientist and university administrator
- Claudine Griggs (born 1953), American author
- Claudine Grimaldi (c. 1541 – 1515), Lady of Monaco
- Claudine Guérin de Tencin (1682–1749), French salonist and author
- Claudine Hermann (1945–2021), French physicist and academic
- Claudine van de Kieft, Dutch cricketer
- Claudine Komgang (born 1974), Cameroonian sprinter
- Claudine de La Tour-Turenne (1520–1591), French lady-in-waiting
- Claudine Lepage (born 1949), French politician
- Claudine LeRoux (born 1964), French sprint canoer
- Claudine Longet (1942–2026), French-American singer, actress and dancer
- Claudine Loquen (born 1965), French painter and sculptor
- Claudine Meffometou (born 1990), Cameroonian footballer
- Claudine Meire (born 1947), French sprinter
- Claudine Mendy (born 1990), French handball player
- Claudine Mercier (born 1961), Canadian entertainer
- Claudine Monfette (born 1945), Canadian actress
- Claudine Monteil (born 1949), French writer and feminist
- Claudine Munari (born 1954), Congolese politician
- Claudine Muno (born 1979), Luxembourgish author, musician and teacher
- Claudine Picardet (1735–1820), French chemist, mineralogist, meteorologist and translator
- Claudine Prudencio is a politician from Benin
- Countess Claudine Rhédey von Kis-Rhéde (1812–1841), Hungarian countess
- Claudine Rinner, French astronomer
- Claudine Sauvé, Canadian cinematographer
- Claudine Schaul (born 1983), Luxembourgish tennis player
- Claudine Schneider (born 1947), American politician
- Claudine Stirling, New Zealand isotope geochemist
- Claudine van der Straten-Ponthoz (1924–1959), Belgian-French mountaineer
- Claudine Talon, Beninese politician
- Claudine Thévenet (1774–1837), French saint
- Claudine Tiercelin (born 1952), French philosopher
- Claudine Toleafoa (born 1970), New Zealand tennis player
- Claudine de la Tour-Turenne (1520–1591), French lady-in-waiting
- Claudine Trécourt (born 1962), French ski mountaineer, guide and teacher
- Claudine Uwera, Rwandan politician and economist
- Claudine Vallerand (1908–2001), Canadian television personality
- Claudine Vidal (born 1937), French sociologist
- Claudine Vita (born 1996), German athletics competitor
- Claudine Weiher (1941–2012), American archivist
- Claudine West (1890–1943), British novelist and screenwriter
- Claudine Wilde (born 1967), German film and television actress
- Claudine Williams (born 1976), Jamaican sprinter

== Fictional characters ==
- Claudine Crane, a character in The Southern Vampire Mysteries novels
- Claudine de Montesse, the protagonist of the 1978 manga series Claudine
- Claudine Saijo, a character in the Revue Starlight franchise
