= Timelines of modern history =

The following are timelines of modern history, from the end of the Middle Ages, c. 1400 – c. 1500, to the present.

== Overview ==
=== Europe ===
"French Revolution". Encyclopædia Britannica. Britannica Editors. 2026-01-16.

Dates are approximate. Consult particular article for details.
Early modern themes
Other themes

=== Elsewhere ===
Dates are approximate. Consult particular article for details.
Early modern themes
Other themes

== General timelines ==
=== Early modern period ===
- For a timeline of events prior to 1501, see 15th century § Events
- For a timeline of events from 1501 to 1600, see 16th century § Significant events
- For a timeline of events from 1601 to 1700, see Timeline of the 17th century
- For a timeline of events from 1701 to 1800, see Timeline of the 18th century

=== Late modern period ===
- For a timeline of events from 1801 to 1900, see Timeline of the 19th century
- For a timeline of events from 1901 to 1945, see Timeline of the 20th century
  - For 1914–1918, see Timeline of World War I
  - For 1918-1939 see Timeline of events preceding World War II
  - For 1939–1945 see Timeline of World War II

=== Contemporary period ===
- For a timeline of events from 1945 to 2000, see Timeline of the 20th century § 1945
  - Timeline of the Cold War
- For a timeline of events from 2001 onward, see Timeline of the 21st century

=== Future ===
- Timelines of the future

== By country ==
- Timeline of Australian history
- Timeline of Austrian history
- Timeline of Bangladeshi history
- Timeline of British history
- Timeline of British diplomatic history
- Timeline of Canadian history
- Timeline of Chinese history
- Timeline of Cuban history
- Timeline of Finnish history
- Timeline of French history
- Timeline of German history
- Timeline of Greek history
- Timeline of Indian history
- Timeline of Italian history
- Timeline of Japanese history
- Timeline of Korean history
- Timeline of Mexican history
- Timeline of Pakistani history
- Timeline of Polish history
- Timeline of Portuguese history
- Timeline of Russian history
- Timeline of Spanish history
- Timeline of Swedish history
- Timeline of Anatolian history
- Timeline of United States history

== Topical timelines ==
- List of years in literature
- Timeline of geopolitical changes (1500–1899)
- Timeline of geopolitical changes (1900–1999)
- Timeline of geopolitical changes (2000–present)
- List of firsts in aviation

=== Exploration ===
- Timeline of European exploration
- List of circumnavigations
- List of Arctic expeditions
- Timeline of Solar System exploration
- Timeline of space exploration

=== Wars ===
- List of wars: 1500–1799
- List of wars: 1800–1899
- List of wars: 1900–1944
- List of wars: 1945–1989
- List of wars: 1990–2002
- List of wars: 2003–2019
- List of wars: 2020–present

== See also ==
- List of timelines
