= 1601 =

1601 in various calendars
- Gregorian calendar: 1601; MDCI
- Ab urbe condita: 2354
- Armenian calendar: 1050; ԹՎ ՌԾ
- Assyrian calendar: 6351
- Balinese saka calendar: 1522–1523
- Bengali calendar: 1007–1008
- Berber calendar: 2551
- English Regnal year: 43 Eliz. 1 – 44 Eliz. 1
- Buddhist calendar: 2145
- Burmese calendar: 963
- Byzantine calendar: 7109–7110
- Chinese calendar: 庚子年 (Metal Rat); 4298 or 4091 — to — 辛丑年 (Metal Ox); 4299 or 4092
- Coptic calendar: 1317–1318
- Discordian calendar: 2767
- Ethiopian calendar: 1593–1594
- Hebrew calendar: 5361–5362
- Hindu calendars
- Vikram Samvat: 1657–1658
- Shaka Samvat: 1522–1523
- Kali Yuga: 4701–4702
- Holocene calendar: 11601
- Igbo calendar: 601–602
- Iranian calendar: 979–980
- Islamic calendar: 1009–1010
- Japanese calendar: Keichō 6 (慶長６年)
- Javanese calendar: 1521–1522
- Julian calendar: Gregorian minus 10 days
- Korean calendar: 3934
- Minguo calendar: 311 before ROC 民前311年
- Nanakshahi calendar: 133
- Thai solar calendar: 2143–2144
- Tibetan calendar: ལྕགས་ཕོ་བྱི་བ་ལོ་ (male Iron-Rat); 1727 or 1346 or 574 — to — ལྕགས་མོ་གླང་ལོ་ (female Iron-Ox); 1728 or 1347 or 575

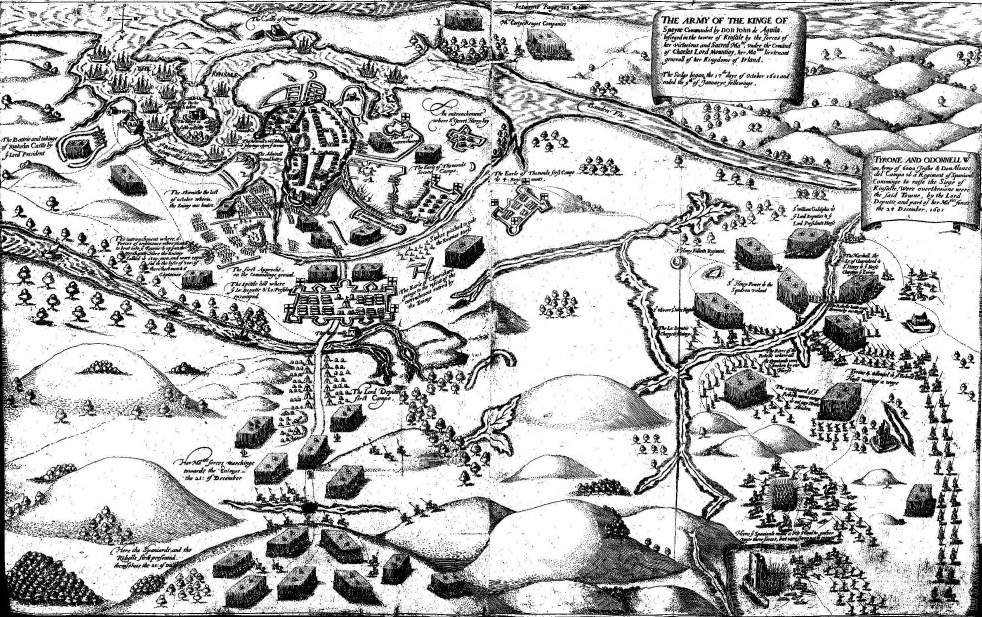
December 24: Siege of Kinsale ended

1601 (MDCI) was a common year starting on Monday of the Gregorian calendar and a common year starting on Thursday of the Julian calendar, the 1601st year of the Common Era (CE) and Anno Domini (AD) designations, the 601st year of the 2nd millennium, the 1st year of the 17th century, and the 2nd year of the 1600s decade. As of the start of 1601, the Gregorian calendar was 10 days ahead of the Julian calendar, which remained in localized use until 1923.

This epoch is the beginning of the 400-year Gregorian leap-year cycle within which digital files first existed; the last year of any such cycle is the only leap year whose year number is divisible by 100.

January 1 of this year (1601-01-01) is used as the base of file dates and of Active Directory Logon dates by Microsoft Windows. It is also the date from which ANSI dates are counted and were adopted by the American National Standards Institute for use with COBOL and other computer languages. All versions of the Microsoft Windows operating system from Windows 95 onward count units of one hundred nanoseconds from this epoch as a counter having 63 bits until 30828/9/14 02:48:05.4775807. April 1 of this year is the earliest possible calendar date in Microsoft Outlook.

== Events ==
=== January–March ===
- January 11 – Valladolid is briefly the capital of Habsburg Spain under Philip III, before returning indefinitely to Madrid in 1606.
- January 17 – Treaty of Lyon: France gains Bresse, Bugey and Gex from Savoy, ceding Saluzzo in exchange.
- February 8 – Robert Devereux, 2nd Earl of Essex, longtime favourite of Queen Elizabeth I of England, begins a rebellion against the Queen. The revolt is crushed the next day. The Earl of Essex and Henry Wriothesley, 3rd Earl of Southampton are arrested and charged with treason. Essex confesses to the plot and then implicates his co-conspirators.
- February 13 – The first East India Company fleet leaves England on its voyage to the East Indies.
- February 23 – Michael the Brave, Prince of Wallachia, arrives in Prague to enlist the assistance of Rudolf II, Holy Roman Emperor in driving Ottoman troops out of Transylvania. Michael leaves on March 5, having received a pledge of Austrian troops to the fight.
- February 25 – The Earl of Essex becomes the first of the Essex's Rebellion participants to be executed. He is beheaded at Tower Hill. His co-conspirator, the Earl of Southampton, sentenced to death, but Queen Elizabeth commutes his penalty to life imprisonment; Southampton will be released two years later.
- March 5 – The treason trial for five secondary participants in Essex's Rebellion – Gelli Meyrick, Henry Cuffe, Christopher Blount, Charles Danvers and Sir John Davies – is held in London. All five are found guilty. Meyrick and Cuffe are hanged at Tyburn on March 13, and Blount and Danvers are beheaded at Tower Hill on March 18. Davies is allowed to go free.
- March 7 – In India, Mughal Empire Prince Daniyal Mirza, son of the Emperor Akbar, is named the ruler of Khandesh, after having completed the conquest of the sultanate of Ahmednagar.
- March 24 – Sigismund Báthory, who had abdicated as Prince of Transylvania in 1599, returns as the leader of the invading Polish Army.

=== April–June ===
- April 3 – At an assembly of nobles at Kolozsvár (now Cluj-Napoca in Romania), Sigismund Báthory is again proclaimed Prince of Transylvania.
- April 22 – The first expedition of the East India Company sets sail from England for the Spice Islands with John Davis as pilot-major.
- May 5 – Dutch explorer Joris van Spilbergen, leading three ships of the Compagnie van De Moucheron, departs on his first expedition to Asia, departing from Veere with the ships Ram, Schaap, and Lam (Ram, Sheep and Lamb). After establishing trade in Sri Lanka, Spilbergen and his crew return to the Dutch Republic in 1604.
- May 28 – Sekigahara Campaign: Japanese warlord Date Masamune leads an unsuccessful attempt to take Fukushima Castle.
- June 23
  - Polish–Swedish War (1600–1611): The Battle of Kokenhausen is fought at Koknese in Livonia (now Latvia) after Swedish troops had invaded the Lithuanian territory). The Polish hussars, commanded by Prince Krzysztof Radziwill, overwhelm a numerically superior force of Swedish attackers led by General Carl Gyllenhielm, and over 2,000 Swedish soldiers are killed.
  - Juan de Oñate, the Spanish colonial administrator in what is now the U.S. state of New Mexico, departs from San Gabriel de Nuevo Mexico with 130 Spanish soldiers and 12 priests on an expedition to explore the interior of the area.

=== July–September ===
- July 2 – The Spanish expedition of Juan de Oñate reaches the Canadian River on (the feast day of Biblical Mary Magdalena), in what is now Texas.
- July 5 – The Siege of Ostend, which will last more than three years and claims more than 100,000 casualties for both Spain and the Netherlands, begins as Albert of Austria, Governor General of the Habsburg Netherlands, leads an attack on the Dutch Netherlands fortress at Ostend. The Spanish forces eventually triumph on September 20, 1604, albeit in a Pyrrhic victory that will see at least 60,000 soldiers killed, wounded, or dead from disease.
- July 22 – General Yemişçi Hasan Pasha is selected as the new Grand Vizier of the Ottoman Empire by Sultan Mehmed III, 12 days after the death of Grand Vizier Damat Ibrahim Pasha. He served for only 15 months before being executed on the Sultan's orders on October 4, 1603.
- August 2 – The Oñate expedition reaches the Rita Blanco River on the day of the Feast of the Porciuncula and follows it northward into Oklahoma.
- August 3 – The Battle of Guruslău takes place in Goroszlo in (now Guruslău in Romania), as Wallachian troops led by Michael the Brave and Giorgio Basta defeat Transylvanian defenders commanded by Sigismund Báthory. Wallachia, assisted by Austrian troops from the Holy Roman Empire, retakes the Principality of Transylvania from Ottoman rule.
- September 2 – 4th Spanish Armada is sent; a fleet of 33 ships and 4,432 men, under the command of Admiral Juan del Águila, departs Portugal after being dispatched to Ireland by King Philip III. The Spanish fleet is intended to support an Irish rebellion led by Hugh O'Neill, Earl of Tyrone and Hugh Roe O'Donnell against the British.
- September 6 – Pope Clement VIII issues a decree forbidding the publication of any litany, except that of the saints as found in the liturgical books and the Litany of Loreto.
- September 9 – The siege of Nagykanizsa, an Ottoman fortress in Hungary, is started by Archduke Ferdinand of Austria and lasts for more than two months before being abandoned.
- September 11 – Queen Elizabeth I summons her 10th, and last, meeting of the English Parliament.
- September 19 – The Juan de Oñate expedition of Spanish explorers first encounters the indigenous Escanjaque Indians in what is now the U.S. state of Kansas. The Escanjaques ask the Spaniards to assist them in a war against a rival tribe, the Rayados. Instead, Oñate befriends the Rayados five days later.
- September 20 – The siege of Székesfehérvár, an Ottoman occupied Hungarian fortress, is completed by troops of the Holy Roman Empire after 16 days. The Ottomans will recapture Székesfehérvár a year later.
- September 28 – The Escanjaque Indians attack Juan de Oñate's Spanish expedition as the Spaniards are returning from their furthest venture east, the Little Arkansas River.

=== October–December ===
- October 2 (September 22 O.S.) – 4th Spanish Armada; a large Spanish fleet, with 4,500 soldiers led by Juan del Águila, lands at Kinsale at County Cork in Ireland, to assist Tyrone's Rebellion.
- October 4 – Claudine de Culam, a 16-year-old girl in the French village of Rognon, is hanged after being convicted of "carnal cohabitation with a dog". The dog is hanged along with her.
- October 26 – Johannes Kepler, assistant to Tycho Brahe, is promoted to the position of Royal Mathematician of the Holy Roman Empire after Brahe's sudden death.
- October 27 – The 10th Parliament of Elizabeth I is opened by Queen Elizabeth I of England. It serves until December 19.
- November 4 – Cyril I is selected as the new leader of the Eastern Orthodox Church as Patriarch of Constantinople and Greek Patriarch of Alexandria, succeeding Meletius I, who died on September 12.
- November 18 – Ottoman defenders commanded by Tiryaki Hasan Pasha successfully resist the Austrian siege of Nagykanizsa.
- December 6 – The Battle of Castlehaven is fought off of the coast of southern Ireland as six Spanish Navy ships led by General Pedro de Zubiaur are intercepted by an English fleet of four warships led and commanded by Sir Richard Levenson. Two of the Spanish ships are sunk, and the other four are run aground.
- December 19 – The 10th Parliament of Elizabeth I is adjourned. Another English Parliament will not be assembled until 1604 when summoned by James I.
- December 24 (Julian calendar, used by the English; January 3, 1602, according to the Gregorian calendar used by the Irish and Spanish forces in the battle) – The Battle of Kinsale ends the siege of Kinsale, Ireland (begun in autumn 1601).
- December 27 – The Battle of Bantam is fought within what is now Indonesia off of the coast of the island of Java, as Walter Harmensz leads five Dutch Republic galleons in a successful attack against a Portuguese fleet led by André Furtado de Mendonça.

=== Date unknown ===
- Dutch troops attack the Portuguese in Malacca.
- Jesuit Matteo Ricci becomes the first European to enter the Forbidden City in Beijing, China, being invited by the Ming Dynasty Emperor.
- A rainy summer in the Tsardom of Russia causes a bad harvest, leading to the Russian famine of 1601–03 which kills about two million people.
- Martin Möller is accused of Crypto-Calvinism.
- Possible first performance of William Shakespeare's tragedy Hamlet, perhaps in springtime.

== Births ==
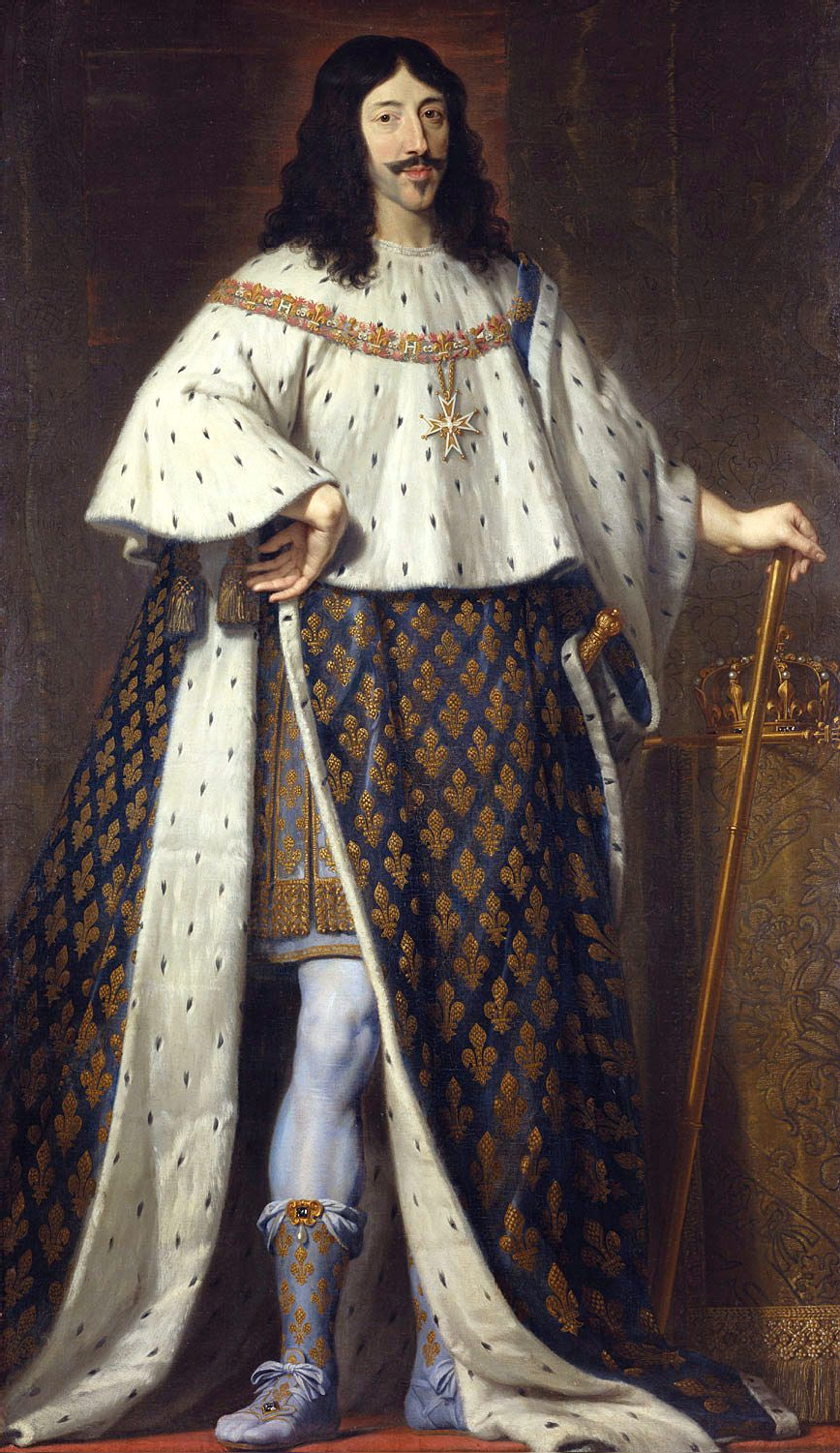
Louis XIII

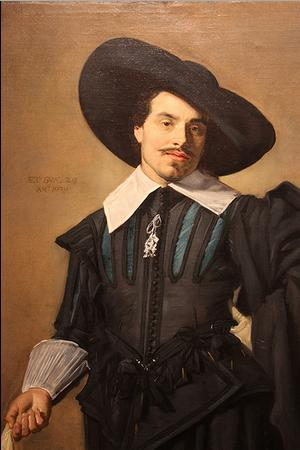
Cornelis Coning

=== January–March ===
- January 8 – Baltasar Gracián y Morales, Spanish prose writer (d. 1658)
- January 19 – Guido Cagnacci, Italian painter (d. 1663)
- February 4 – Shi Kefa, Chinese Ming Dynasty official (d. 1645)
- February 21 – Carolus Mulerius, Dutch Hispanist (d. 1638)
- February 22 – Pierre Chanut, French diplomat (d. 1662)
- March 7 – Johann Michael Moscherosch, German statesman, satirist (d. 1669)
- March 19 – Alonso Cano, Spanish painter (d. 1667)
- March 20 – Henri, Count of Harcourt (d. 1666)
- March 22 – John Scudamore, 1st Viscount Scudamore, English politician and Viscount (d. 1671)
- March 31 – Jakov Mikalja, Italian linguist and lexicographer (d. 1654)

=== April–June ===
- May – Spencer Compton, 2nd Earl of Northampton (d. 1643)
- May 3 – Nathaniel Dickinson, American settler (d. 1676)
- May 27 – Antoine Daniel, Jesuit missionary at Sainte-Marie among the Hurons (d. 1648)
- June 5 – John Trapp, English theologian (d. 1669)
- June 6 – Hendrick Bloemaert, Dutch painter (d. 1672)
- June 21 – Godfrey Henschen, Jesuit hagiographer (d. 1681)
- June 23 – Anna Maria of Ostfriesland, German noblewoman (d. 1634)
- June 26 – Dorothea of Saxe-Altenburg, Duchess consort of Saxe-Eisenach (d. 1675)

=== July–September ===
- July 17 – Emmanuel Maignan, French physicist and theologian (d. 1676)
- July 18 – Philip I, Count of Schaumburg-Lippe (1640–1681) (d. 1681)
- July 20 – Robert Wallop, English politician (d. 1667)
- July 23 – János Szalárdi, Hungarian historian (d. 1666)
- July 30
  - Anne Eleonore of Hesse-Darmstadt, Duchess of Brunswick-Lüneburg by marriage (d. 1659)
  - Richard Onslow, English MP (d. 1664)
- August 11 – John Evelyn, English politician (d. 1685)
- August 15 – John Campanius, Swedish Lutheran minister in New Sweden (d. 1683)
- August 22 – Georges de Scudéry, French novelist, dramatist and poet (d. 1667)
- September 13
  - Axel Urup, Danish general (d. 1671)
  - Jan Brueghel the Younger, Flemish painter (d. 1678)
- September 22 – Anne of Austria, queen of Louis XIII and regent of France (d. 1666)
- September 27 – King Louis XIII of France (d. 1643)

=== October–December ===
- October 7 – Florimond de Beaune, French mathematician and jurist (d. 1652)
- October 9 – Fra Bonaventura Bisi, Italian painter (d. 1659)
- October 24 – Alvise Contarini, Doge of Venice (d. 1684)
- October 25 – John Frederick, Lord Mayor of London (d. 1685)
- October 26 – Jan Reynst, Dutch art collector (d. 1646)
- November 3 – Henri, Duke of Verneuil, French bishop (d. 1682)
- November 14 – John Eudes, French missionary (d. 1680)
- November 15 – Cecco Bravo, Italian painter (d. 1661)
- December 25 – Ernest I, Duke of Saxe-Gotha (1640–1675) and Saxe-Altenburg (1672–1675) (d. 1675)

=== Date unknown ===
- William Coddington, first governor of Rhode Island (d. 1678)
- Catherine Lepère, French midwife and abortion provider (k. 1679)
- Jacques Gaffarel, French librarian and astrologer (d. 1681)
- Cornelis Coning, Dutch engraver and mayor of Haarlem (d. 1671)

=== Probable ===
- William Brooke, 12th Baron Cobham, English politician (d. 1643)
- Adrian Scrope, English regicide (d. 1660)
- Rose of Turaida, famous Latvian murder victim (d. 1620)
- François Tristan l'Hermite, French dramatist (d. 1655)
- Edward Somerset, 2nd Marquess of Worcester (d. 1667)

== Deaths ==
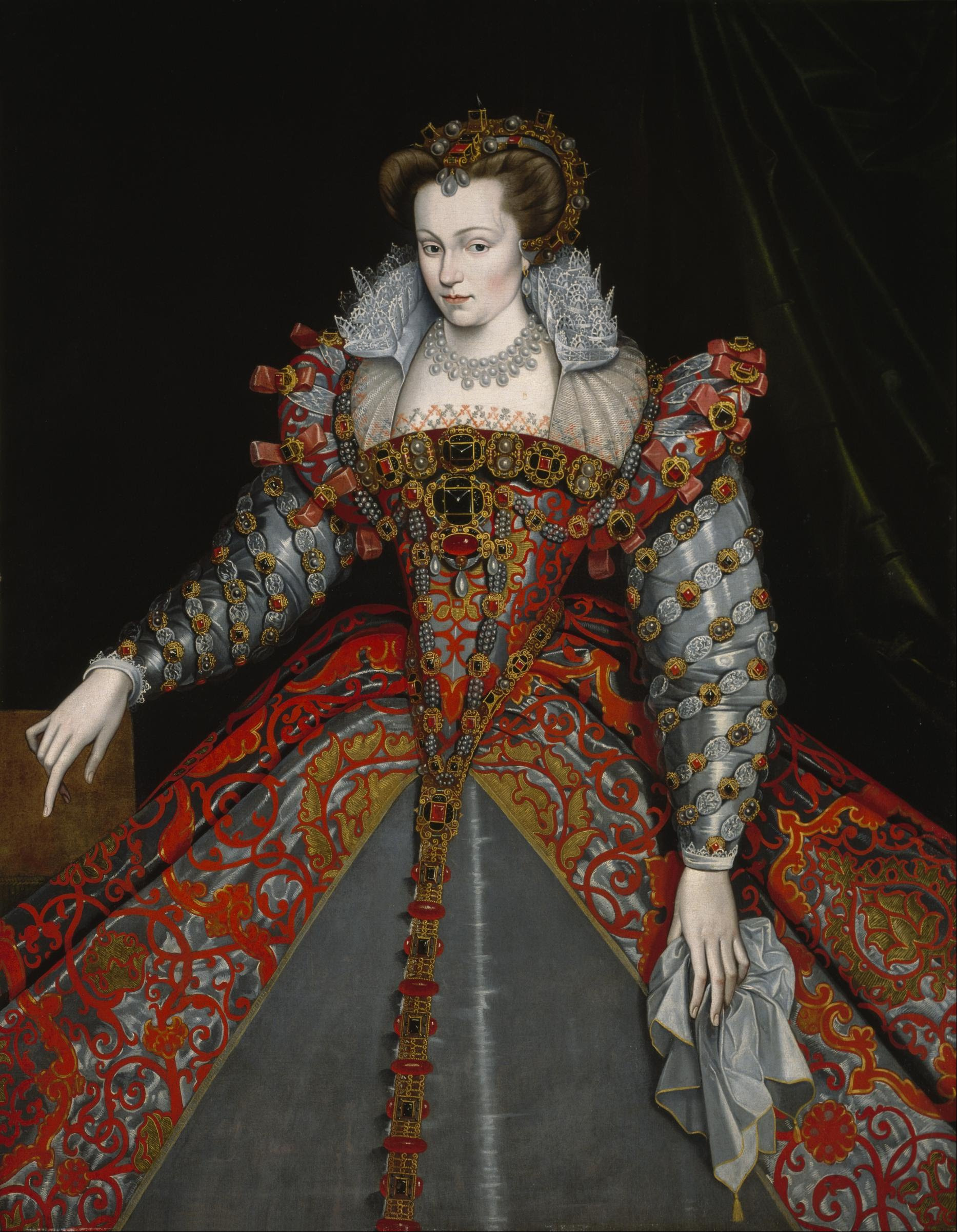
Louise of Lorraine

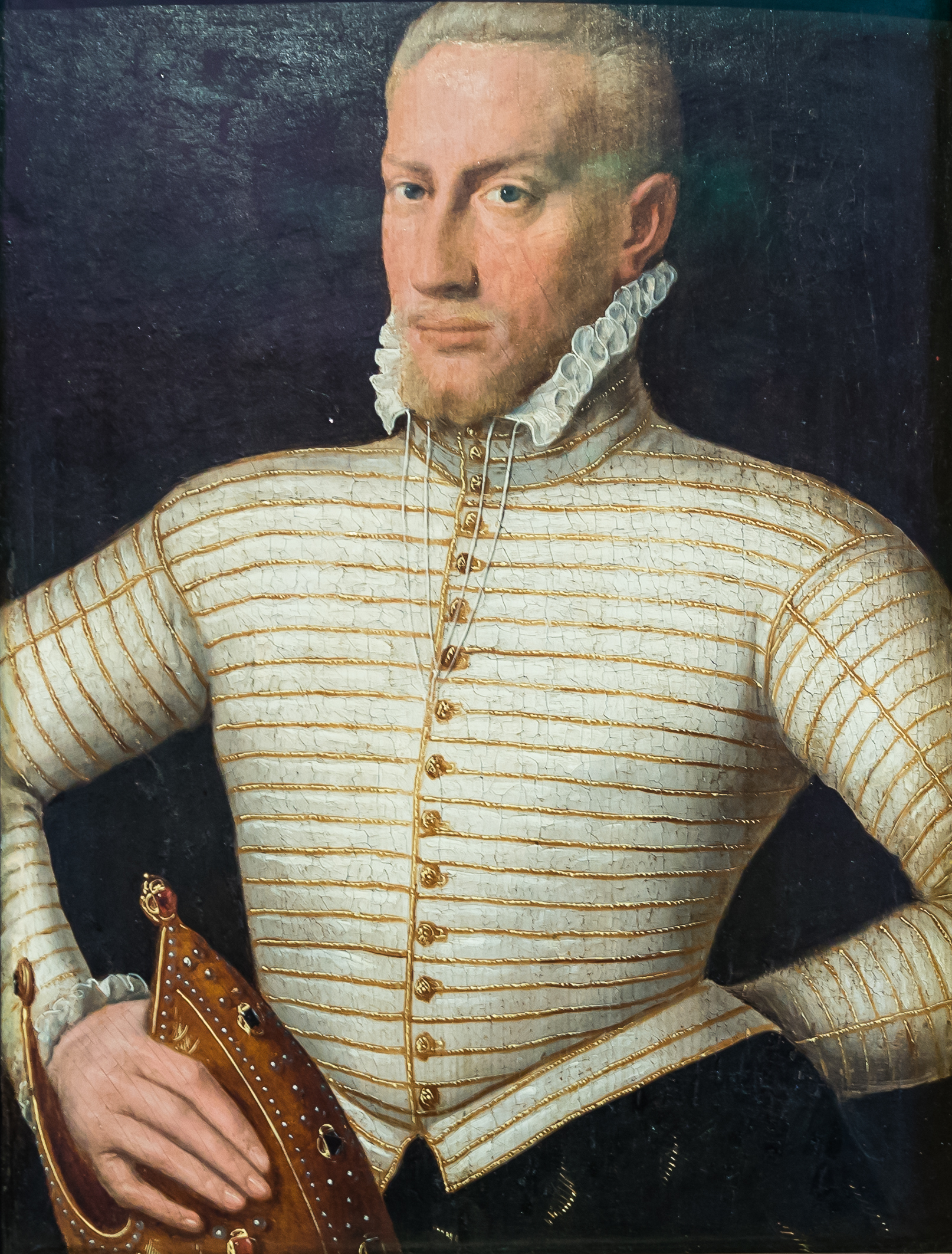
Gebhard Truchsess von Waldburg

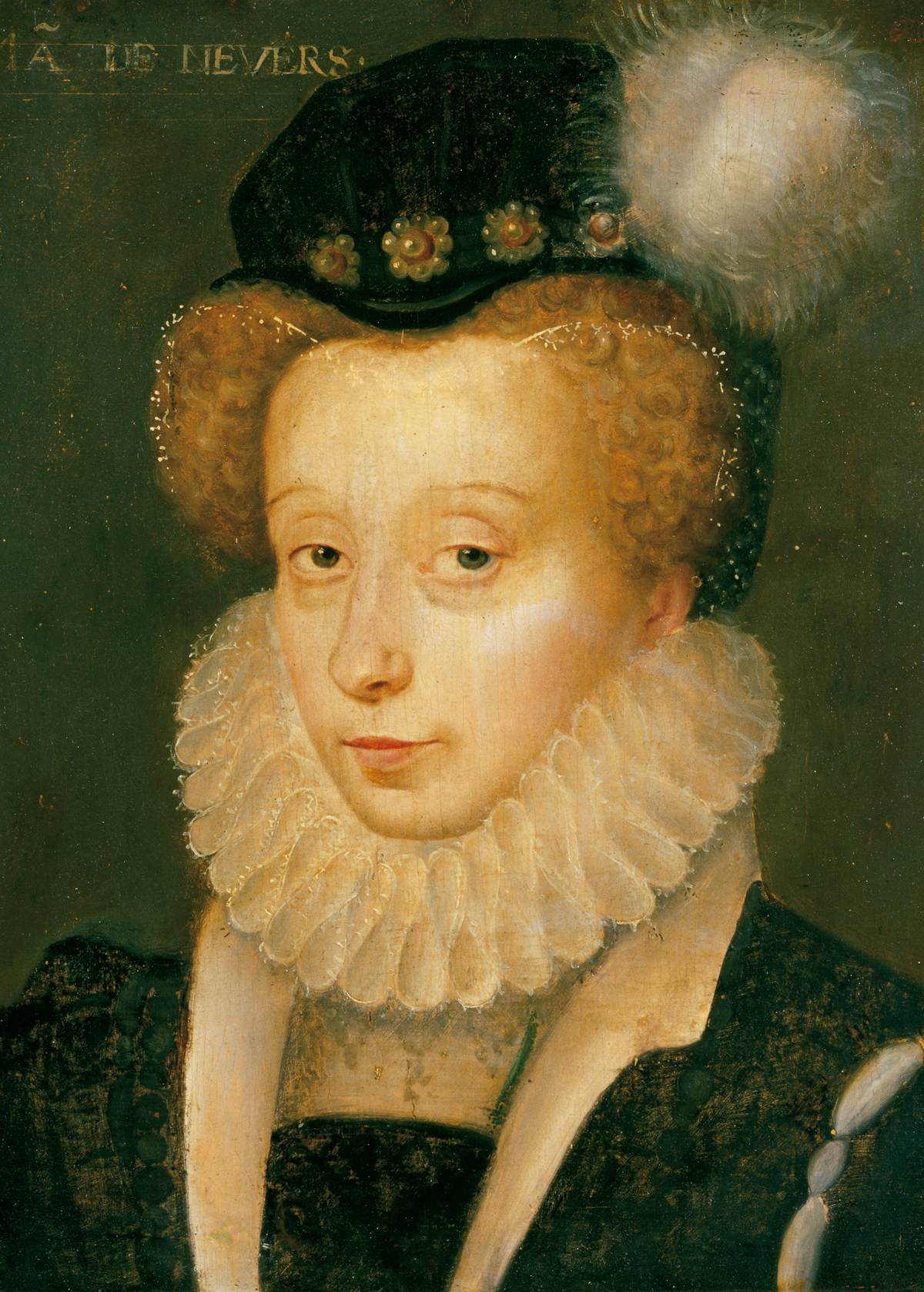
Henriette of Cleves

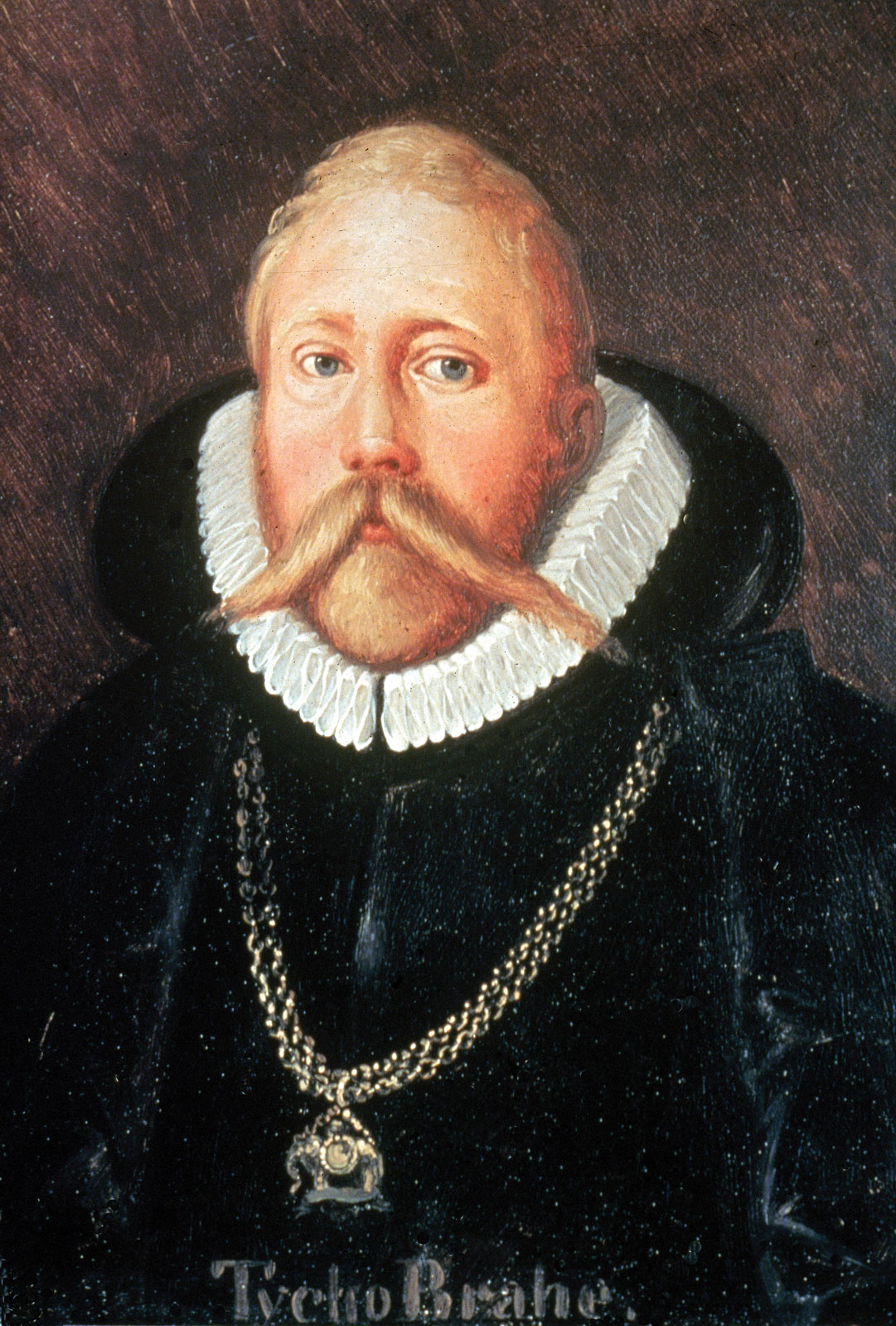
Tycho Brahe

=== January–March ===
- January 11 – Scipione Ammirato, Italian historian (b. 1531)
- January 17 – Christoffer Valkendorff, Danish politician (b. 1525)
- January 19 – Henry Herbert, 2nd Earl of Pembroke, English statesman (b. 1538)
- January 29 – Louise of Lorraine, French queen consort (b. 1553)
- February 7 – Martin Garzez, Aragonese-born 53rd Grandmaster of the Knights Hospitaller (b. 1526)
- February 25 – Robert Devereux, 2nd Earl of Essex, English politician (b. 1566)
- February 27 – Anne Line, English Catholic martyr (b. c. 1563)
- March 2 – Antonio del Rincón, Mexican academic (b. 1566)
- March 13 – Henry Cuffe, English politician (b. 1563)

=== April–June ===
- April 5 – Wolfgang von Dalberg, Roman Catholic Archbishop of Mainz, Germany (b. 1538)
- April 10 – Mark Alexander Boyd, Scottish poet and soldier of fortune (b. 1562)
- May 10 – Hans van Steenwinckel the Elder, Flemish/Danish architect, sculptor (b. 1550)
- May 12 – Anna III, Abbess of Quedlinburg, Princess-Abbess of Quedlinburg (b. 1565)
- May 19 – Costanzo Porta, Italian composer (b. 1528)
- May 21 – Gebhard Truchsess von Waldburg, Archbishop-Elector of Cologne (b. 1547)
- June 11 – Françoise d'Orléans-Longueville, French princess (b. 1549)
- June 16 – Lewis Mordaunt, 3rd Baron Mordaunt, Member of Parliament and High Sheriff of Bedfordshire and Buckinghamshire (b. 1538)
- June 17 – Gabriel Goodman, English priest (b. 1528)
- June 24 – Henriette of Cleves, Duchess of Nevers, Countess of Rethel (b. 1542)
- June 25 – Peregrine Bertie, 13th Baron Willoughby de Eresby, English baron (b. 1555)
- June 27 – Henry Norris, 1st Baron Norreys (b. 1525)

=== July–September ===
- August 9 – Prince Michael the Brave of Wallachia (b. 1558)
- August 11 – Johannes Heurnius, Dutch physician (b. 1543)
- August 19 – William Lambarde, English antiquarian and politician (b. 1536)
- September 7 – John Shakespeare, English glover, father of William Shakespeare (b. 1529)
- September 12 – Meletius I of Constantinople, Greek Patriarch of Constantinople and Alexandria (b. 1549)
- September 20 – Fernando Ruiz de Castro Andrade y Portugal, Grandee of Spain (b. 1548)

=== October–December ===
- October 12 – Nicholas Brend, English landowner (b. 1560)
- October 21 – Hoshina Masanao, Japanese daimyō of the Takeda clan (b. 1542)
- October 24
  - Tycho Brahe, Danish astronomer (b. 1546)
  - Louis Philip, Count Palatine of Guttenberg, Palatinate-Veldenz (b. 1577)
- November 16 – Charles Neville, 6th Earl of Westmorland, exiled English nobleman (b. 1542)
- December 3 – Peter Thyraeus, German theologian (b. 1546)
- December 17 – Bernardino de Cárdenas y Portugal, Duque de Maqueda, Spanish noble (b. 1553)

=== Date unknown ===
- Girolamo Dalla Casa, Italian composer
- Ogawa Suketada, Japanese daimyō (b. 1549)
- Onodera Shigemichi, Japanese samurai
