= Modern era =

Current period of history

The modern era, or the modern period, is considered the current historical period of human history. It was originally applied to the history of Europe and Western history for events that came after classical antiquity and the Middle Ages, often from around the year 1500. An example is the Reformation, which gave rise to Protestantism in Germany and elsewhere. Since the 1990s, it has been more common among historians to refer to the period after the Middle Ages and up to the 19th century as the early modern period. The modern period is today more often used for events from the 19th century until today. The time from the end of World War II (1945) can also be described as being part of contemporary history. The common definition of the modern period today is often associated with events such as the French Revolution, the Industrial Revolution, and the transition from nationalism toward the liberal international order.

The modern period has been a period of significant development in the fields of science, politics, warfare, and technology. It has also been an Age of Discovery and globalization. During this time, the European powers and later their colonies strengthened their political, economic, and cultural colonization of the rest of the world. It also created a new modern lifestyle and has permanently changed the way people around the world live.

In the 19th and early 20th centuries, modernist art, politics, science, and culture came to dominate not only Western Europe and North America, but almost every area on the globe, including movements thought of as opposed to the Western world and globalization. The modern era is closely associated with the development of individualism, capitalism, socialism, urbanization, and a belief in the positive possibilities of technological and political progress.

The world wars, Cold War, and other conflicts of this era, many of which come from the effects of rapid change, and the connected loss of strength of traditional religious and ethical norms, have led to many reactions against modern development. Optimism and the belief in constant progress have been most recently criticized by postmodernism, while the dominance of Western Europe and North America over the rest of the world has been criticized by postcolonial theory.

== Terminology ==
Eras cannot easily be defined for periodization, the process of categorizing the past into quantified, named blocks of time for the purpose of analysis. 1500 is an approximate starting period for the modern era because many major events caused the Western world to change around then: from the fall of Constantinople (1453), Gutenberg's moveable-type printing press (1450s), and Christopher Columbus's voyage to the Americas (1492), to the Reformation begun with Martin Luther's Ninety-five Theses (1517).

The term "modern" was coined shortly before 1585 to describe the beginning of a new era. It was long thought that the term "early modern" was invented either in the 1930s, to distinguish the time between the Middle Ages and the late Enlightenment (1800), or the mid-20th century, and only gained traction in the 1960s. Justus Nipperdey pointed to its widespread usage by American historians around 1900 already, adding: 'In the interwar years the term permeated all areas of professional activity from textbooks and graduate school seminars to conferences, research articles, and job descriptions.' The difference between "early modern" and "modern" was defined by the French Revolution and the Industrial Revolution. The European Renaissance (14th–16th centuries), which started in Italy, is an important transition period beginning in the Late Middle Ages and marking the change into early modern history.

Sometimes distinct from the modern periods themselves, the terms "modernity" and "modernism" refer to a new way of thinking, distinct from previous ways of thinking such as medieval thinking. "Postmodernism", coined in 1949, describes a movement in art rather than a period of history, and is usually applied to the arts, but not to any events of recent history. This changed when postmodernity was coined to describe major changes in the 1960s in economy, society, culture, and philosophy.

These terms stem from European history. In worldwide usage, such as in China, India, and Islam, the terms are applied in a different way, but often in the context of their contact with European culture in the Age of Discovery.

== Characteristics ==
Changes, mostly seen as advances, in all areas of human activity—politics, industry, society, economics, commerce, transport, communication, mechanization, automation, science, medicine, technology, religion, the arts, and other aspects of culture—appear to have transformed an Old World into the Modern or New World. In each case, the identification of the change over time can be used to demarcate the old and old-fashioned from the modern.

Starting in western countries, the modern world has seen a systematic re-evaluation of value systems, monarchical regimes, and feudal economic systems. These have often been replaced by democratic and liberal ideas in the areas of politics, science, psychology, sociology, and economics.

Some events of modern history, though born out of contexts not entirely new, show a new way of perceiving the world. The concept of modernity interprets the general meaning of these events and seeks explanations for major developments. Historians analyze the events taking place in Modern Times, since the so-called "Middle Ages" (between Modern and Ancient Times).

== Early modern period ==
=== Late 15th to 17th century ===
Spread of printing by Johannes Gutenberg from Mainz in Europe in the 15th century

==== Renaissance and Reformation (c. 1400–1550) ====
- Johannes Gutenberg's movable‐type printing press (c. 1450s) ushered in the information age and rise of newspapers.
- Conquest of Constantinople by the Ottoman Empire (1453) marked the fall of the Byzantine Empire.
- Christopher Columbus's first voyage to the Americas (1492) initiated sustained contact between Europe and the New World.
- Amerigo Vespucci's Mundus Novus letter (1503), the first explicit articulation in print of the hypothesis that the lands discovered by European navigators to the west were not the edges of Asia but rather an entirely different continent, is published.
- Niccolò Machiavelli's The Prince (c. 1513), a foundational work of modern political philosophy.
- Martin Luther's posting of the 95 Theses (1517) ignited the Reformation.
- The broader Age of Discovery saw unprecedented maritime exploration and early colonial empires.
- Nicolaus Copernicus's De revolutionibus orbium coelestium (1543) proposes that the Earth revolves around the Sun.
- Council of Trent (1545) begins the Catholic Counter-Reformation.
- Rise of Mercantilism as the prevailing economic theory.

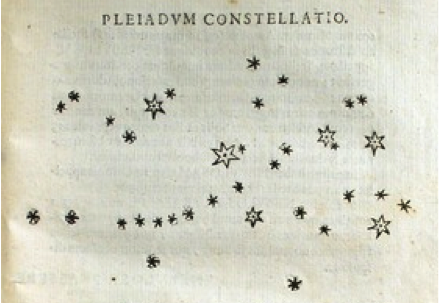
Galileo reported in the Starry Messenger (1610) that he saw at least ten times more stars through the telescope than are visible to the naked eye.

==== Scientific Revolution and early Baroque (c. 1550–1700) ====
- Tycho Brahe observes a new star (1572), brighter than any star or planet, that ought not to exist.
- Defeat of the Spanish Armada (1588) secured English naval supremacy and enabled the rise of the British Empire.
- Johannes Kepler's Astronomia nova (1609) includes the first mention of elliptical planetary orbits.
- Galileo Galilei's Starry Messenger (1610) was the first published work of observations made through a telescope.
- The Thirty Years' War (1618–1648) devastated Europe and reshaped its political order.
- The Peace of Westphalia treaties (1648) ended multiple European conflicts and established the principle of state sovereignty.
- Isaac Newton's Philosophiæ Naturalis Principia Mathematica (1687) formulates the laws of motion and the law of universal gravitation.
- The Glorious Revolution (1688) in England affirmed parliamentary supremacy over the monarchy.
- Early reign of Louis XIV (1643–1715), epitomizing the Age of Absolutism in France.

=== 18th century ===
==== Age of Enlightenment and Revolution (c. 1700–1800) ====
- War of the Spanish Succession (1701–1714), concluded by the Peace of Utrecht and redrawing dynastic and colonial boundaries.
- War of the Austrian Succession (1740–1748), contesting Habsburg succession and reshaping Central Europe.
- Seven Years' War (1756–1763), the first truly global conflict, spanning Europe, North America (known in the US as the French and Indian War), India and the Caribbean.
- Onset of the Industrial Revolution (c. 1760), beginning in Britain with mechanization of textile production and development of the steam engine.
- American Revolution (1775–1783), resulting in the independence of the United States of America.
- French Revolution (1789–1799), which overthrew the Bourbon monarchy and established the First French Republic.
- Ottoman Old Regime (1703–1789) followed by the decline and modernization of the Ottoman Empire.

== 19th century ==
Historians sometimes define a nineteenth-century historical era from 1815 (the Congress of Vienna) to 1914 (the outbreak of World War I). Alternatively, Eric Hobsbawm defined the "long nineteenth century" as spanning from 1789 (the French Revolution) to 1914.

During this century, the Spanish, Portuguese, and Ottoman Empires began to decline. The Ottoman Empire suffered territorial losses in the eastern Mediterranean and Balkans. The Holy Roman Empire was dissolved in 1806 by Emperor Francis II. The Mughal Empire effectively ended after the Indian Rebellion of 1857.

=== Napoleonic era (1799–1815) ===
The Napoleonic era, regarded as the fourth phase of the French Revolution, began with Napoleon's coup in 1799 and ended with his defeat at the Battle of Waterloo in 1815. The subsequent Congress of Vienna (1814–1815) sought to restore the pre-Revolutionary balance of power across Europe.

=== Spreading of the Industrial Revolution ===
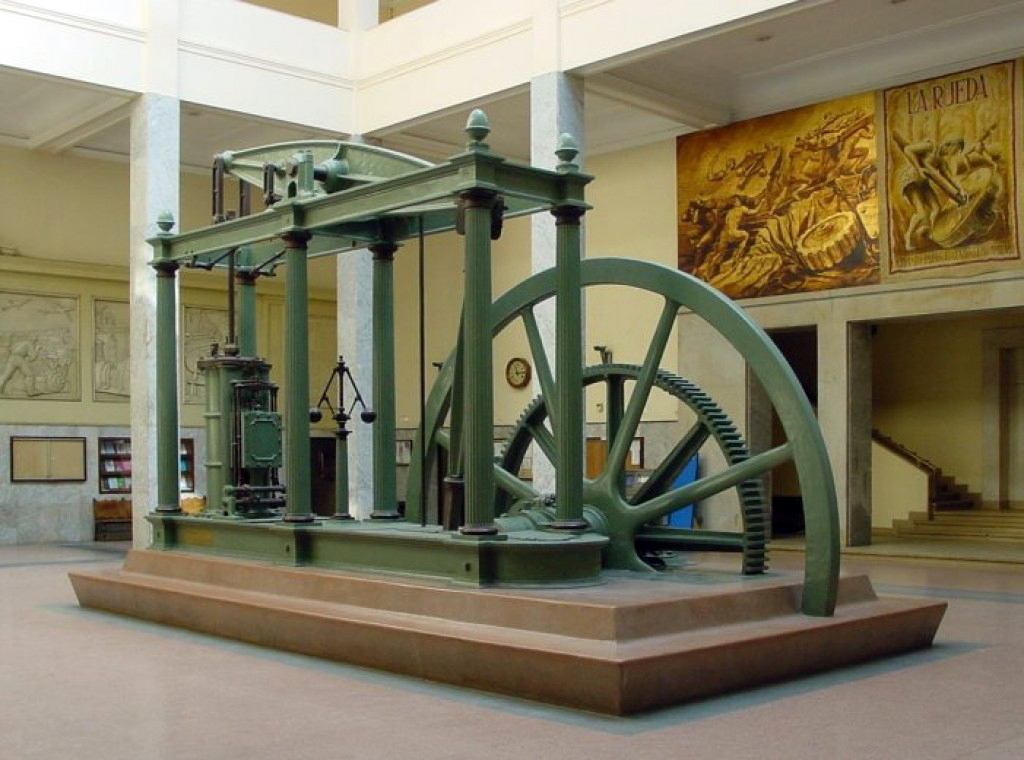
A Watt steam engine in Madrid. The development of the steam engine started the Industrial Revolution in England. The steam engine was created to pump water from coal mines, enabling them to be deepened beyond groundwater levels.

The Industrial Revolution was the major technological, socioeconomic, and cultural change in the late 18th and early 19th centuries that began in Britain and spread throughout the world. During that time, an economy based on manual labour was replaced by one dominated by industry and the manufacture of machinery. It began with the mechanisation of the textile industries and the development of iron-making techniques, and trade expansion was enabled by the introduction of canals, improved roads, and then railways. The introduction of steam power (fuelled primarily by coal) and powered machinery (mainly in textile manufacturing) underpinned the dramatic increases in production capacity. The development of all-metal machine tools in the first two decades of the 19th century facilitated the manufacture of more production machines for manufacturing in other industries.

The date of the Industrial Revolution is not exact. Eric Hobsbawm held that it "broke out" in the 1780s and was not fully felt until the 1830s or 1840s, while T. S. Ashton held that it occurred roughly between 1760 and 1830 (in effect the reigns of George III, the Regency, and George IV).

The effects spread throughout Western Europe and North America during the 19th century, eventually affecting the majority of the world. The impact of this change on society was enormous and is often compared to the Neolithic Revolution, when mankind developed agriculture and gave up its nomadic lifestyle.

The First Industrial Revolution gave way to the Second Industrial Revolution around 1850, when technological and economic progress gained momentum with the development of steam-powered ships and railways, and later in the nineteenth century with the internal combustion engine and electric power generation.

=== Late 19th century ===
Following the Napoleonic Wars, the British Empire became the world's leading power, controlling one-quarter of the world's population and one-third of the land area. It enforced a Pax Britannica, encouraged trade, and battled rampant piracy.

Slavery was greatly reduced around the world. Following a successful slave revolt in Haiti, Britain forced the Barbary pirates to halt their practice of kidnapping and enslaving Europeans, passed the Slavery Abolition Act 1833—which banned slavery throughout its domain—and charged its navy with ending the global slave trade. Slavery was then abolished in Russia in 1861, by the Emancipation Proclamation in the United States in 1863, and in Brazil in 1888. (see Abolitionism).

Following the abolition of the slave trade, and propelled by economic exploitation, the Scramble for Africa was initiated formally at the Berlin West Africa Conference in 1884–1885. All the major European powers laid claim to the areas of Africa where they could exhibit a sphere of influence over the area. These claims did not have to have any substantial land holdings or treaties to be legitimate. The French gained major ground in West Africa, the British in East Africa, and the Portuguese and Spanish at various points throughout the continent, while Leopold II of Belgium was able to retain his personal fiefdom, Congo.

Electricity, steel, and petroleum fuelled a Second Industrial Revolution which enabled Germany, Japan, and the United States to become great powers that raced to create empires of their own. However, Russia and China failed to keep pace with the other world powers, which led to massive social unrest in both empires.

== 20th century ==
While earlier centuries also saw significant developments, the 20th century was distinguished by the unprecedented pace and global scale of economic, technological, and cultural changes.

Still, advancing technology and medicine have had a great impact even in the Global South. Large-scale industry and more centralized media made brutal dictatorships possible on an unprecedented scale in the middle of the century, leading to wars that were also unprecedented. However, the increased communications contributed to democratization.

Technological developments included the development of airplanes and space exploration, nuclear technology, advancement in genetics, and the dawning of the Information Age.

Major political developments included the Israeli–Palestinian conflict, two world wars, and the Cold War. It also saw the former British Empire lose most of its remaining political power over Commonwealth countries, most notably by the division of the British crown into several sovereignties by the Statute of Westminster, the patriation of constitutions by the Canada Act 1982, and the Australia Act 1986, as well as the independence of countries such as India, Pakistan, South Africa, and Ireland.

=== World War I ===
The First World War was a world conflict, lasting from July 1914 to the final Armistice on 11 November 1918. The Allied Powers, led by the British Empire, France, Russia until March 1918, Japan, and the United States after 1917, defeated the Central Powers, led by the German Empire, the Austro-Hungarian Empire, and the Ottoman Empire. The war caused the disintegration of four empires—the Austro-Hungarian, German, Ottoman, and Russian ones—as well as radical change in the European and Middle Eastern maps. The Allied Powers before 1917 are sometimes referred to as the Triple Entente, and the Central Powers are sometimes referred to as the Triple Alliance.

Much of the fighting in World War I took place along the Western Front, within a system of opposing manned trenches and fortifications (separated by a "no man's land") running from the North Sea to the border of Switzerland. On the Eastern Front, the vast eastern plains and limited rail network prevented a trench warfare stalemate from developing, although the scale of the conflict was just as large. Hostilities also occurred on and under the sea and—for the first time—from the air. More than 9 million soldiers died on the various battlefields, and nearly that many more in the participating countries' home fronts on account of food shortages and genocide committed under the cover of various civil wars and internal conflicts. Notably, more people died of the worldwide influenza outbreak at the end of the war and shortly after than died in the hostilities. The unsanitary conditions engendered by the war, severe overcrowding in barracks, wartime propaganda interfering with public health warnings, and migration of so many soldiers around the world helped the outbreak become a pandemic.

Ultimately, World War I created a decisive break with the old world order that had emerged after the Napoleonic Wars, which was modified by the mid-19th century's nationalistic revolutions. The results of World War I would be important factors in the development of World War II approximately 20 years later.

=== Interwar period ===
The Interwar period was the period between the end of World War I in 1918 and the beginning of World War II in 1939. It included the Roaring Twenties, the Great Depression, and the rise of communism in Russia and fascism in Italy and Germany.

=== World War II ===
World War II was a global military conflict that took place in 1939–1945. It was the largest and deadliest war in history, culminating in the Holocaust and ending with the dropping of the atomic bomb.

Although Japan had invaded China in 1937, the conventional view is that World War II began on 1 September 1939, when Nazi Germany invaded Poland. Within two days, the United Kingdom and France declared war on Germany, even though the fighting was confined to Poland. Pursuant to a then-secret provision of its non-aggression Molotov–Ribbentrop Pact, the Soviet Union joined Germany on 17 September 1939 to conquer Poland and divide Eastern Europe. The Allies were initially made up of Poland, the United Kingdom, France, Australia, Canada, New Zealand, South Africa, as well as British Commonwealth countries which were controlled directly by the UK, such as the Indian Empire. All of these countries declared war on Germany in September 1939.

Following the lull in fighting, known as the "Phoney War", Germany invaded western Europe in May 1940. Six weeks later, France, in the meantime attacked by Italy as well, surrendered to Germany, which then tried unsuccessfully to conquer Britain. On 27 September, Germany, Italy, and Japan signed a mutual defense agreement, the Tripartite Pact, and were known as the Axis powers. Nine months later, on 22 June 1941, Germany launched a massive invasion of the Soviet Union, which prompted it to join the Allies. Germany was now engaged in fighting a war on two fronts.

On 7 December 1941, Japan attacked the United States at Pearl Harbor, bringing it into the war on the side of the Allies. China also joined the Allies, as did most of the rest of the world. China was in turmoil at the time and attacked Japanese armies through guerrilla-type warfare. By the beginning of 1942, the alignment of the major combatants was as follows: the British Commonwealth, the Soviet Union, and the United States were fighting Germany and Italy; China, the British Commonwealth, and the United States were fighting Japan. The United Kingdom, the United States, the Soviet Union, and China were referred to as a "trusteeship of the powerful" during World War II and were recognized as the Allied "Big Four" in the Declaration by United Nations. These four countries were considered the "Four Policemen" or "Four Sheriffs" of the Allies and were the primary victors of World War II. Battles raged across all of Europe, in the North Atlantic Ocean, across North Africa, throughout Southeast Asia, throughout China, across the Pacific Ocean, and in the air over Japan. Italy surrendered in September 1943 and was split into a northern Germany-occupied puppet state and an Allies-friendly state in the south; Germany surrendered in May 1945. Following the atomic bombings of Hiroshima and Nagasaki, Japan surrendered, marking the end of the war on 2 September 1945.

It is possible that around 62 million people died in the war; estimates vary greatly. About 60% of all casualties were civilians, who died as a result of disease, starvation, genocide (in particular, the Holocaust), and aerial bombing. The former Soviet Union and China suffered the most casualties. Estimates place deaths in the Soviet Union at around 23 million, while China suffered about 10 million. No country lost a greater portion of its population than Poland: approximately 5.6 million, or 16%, of its pre-war population of 34.8 million died. The Holocaust (which roughly means "burnt whole") was the deliberate and systematic murder of millions of Jews and other "unwanted" groups during World War II by the Nazi regime in Germany. Several differing views exist regarding whether it was intended to occur from the war's beginning or if the plans for it came about later. Regardless, persecution of Jews extended well before the war even started, such as during Kristallnacht (Night of Broken Glass). The Nazis used propaganda to great effect to stir up anti-Semitic feelings within ordinary Germans.

After World War II, Europe was informally split into Western and Soviet spheres of influence. Western Europe later aligned as NATO, and Eastern Europe as the Warsaw Pact. There was a shift in power from Western Europe and the British Empire to the two new superpowers, the United States and the Soviet Union. These two rivals would later face off in the Cold War. In Asia, the defeat of Japan led to its democratization. China's civil war continued through and after the war, eventually resulting in the establishment of the People's Republic of China. The former colonies of the European powers began their road to independence.

=== Cold War ===
The Cold War between the "West" (the United States, Western Europe, and Japan) and the "East" (the Soviet Union, Eastern Europe, and China) dominated politics from the end of World War II in 1945 until the collapse of the Soviet Union in 1991, at which point the Cold War ended and the post–Cold War era began (which includes most of the 1990s).

The Korean War, Vietnam War, Soviet–Afghan War, and Gulf War impacted political life, while the counterculture of the 1960s and the rise of computers changed society in different, complex ways, including higher social and local mobility.

== Post–Cold War era ==
=== 1990s ===
At the end of the twentieth century, the world was at a major crossroads. Throughout the century, more technological advances had been made than in all of preceding history. Computers, the Internet, and other technologies radically altered daily lives. However, several problems faced the world during the Cold War period and the 1990s that followed.

First of all, the gap between rich and poor nations continued to widen. Some said that this problem could not be fixed, arguing that there was a set amount of wealth and it could only be shared by so many. Others claimed that powerful nations with large economies were not doing enough to help improve the rapidly evolving economies of the Third World. Developing countries faced many challenges, including the scale of the task to be surmounted, rapidly growing populations, and the need to protect the environment, along with the associated costs.

Secondly, disease threatened to destabilize many regions of the world. Viruses such as West Nile and Avian influenza continued to spread quickly and easily. In poor nations, malaria and other diseases affected the majority of the population. Millions were infected with HIV, the virus that causes AIDS, which was becoming an epidemic in southern Africa and around the world.

Increased globalization, specifically Americanization, was also occurring. While not necessarily a threat, it was causing anti-Western and anti-American feelings in parts of the world, especially in the Middle East. English was quickly becoming the global language, with people who did not speak it becoming increasingly disadvantaged.

Terrorism, dictatorship, and the spread of nuclear weapons were also issues requiring immediate attention. Dictators such as Kim Jong-il in North Korea continued to lead their nations toward the development of nuclear weapons. The fear existed that not only were terrorists already attempting to obtain nuclear weapons, but that they had already acquired them.

== See also ==
- Postmodernity
- Ancient history
- Post-classical history
- Quarrel of the Ancients and the Moderns
- Timelines of modern history

== Other sources ==
- Nipperdey, Justus (6 July 2022). "Inventing "Early Modern" Europe: Fashioning a New Historical Period in American Historiography 1880–1945". Journal of Early Modern History. 27 (3). Brill: 199–223. doi:10.1163/15700658-bja10051. ISSN 1385-3783.
