= Nursery School Time =

Canadian children's television series

- Genre: Children's television
- Country of origin: Canada
- Original language: English
- No. of seasons: 6

Production
- Producers: Thomas Knight (1958-1959); Rena Elder (1959-1961); Dennis Spence (1961-1962); Denyse Adams (1961-1962)
- Running time: 15 minutes

Original release
- Network: CBC Television
- Release: 21 January 1958 – 31 May 1963

Nursery School Time is a Canadian children's television series that aired on CBC Television from 1958 to 1963.

== Premise ==
This series featured entertaining and educational topics for preschool children. It was produced by the CBC's School Broadcast Department which made program plans and recommended reading lists available to parents.

Production of the first run from January to April 1958 was shared between Toronto and Winnipeg, hosted by Teddy Forman and Shirley Knight respectively. Hoppy, a rabbit puppet, was featured on the Toronto episodes. After receiving positive feedback from this initial run, Nursery School Time was renewed for a full season that September. The Toronto segments with Forman and Hoppy were retained with the addition of Smokey, an actual cat. Production from Winnipeg was discontinued in favour of segments from Montreal hosted by Madame Fon Fon (Claudine Vallerand, from Radio-Canada), Mr. Dick (a beaver puppet) and Miki (an actual dog).

Madame Fon Fon was replaced by Madeleine Arbour for the Montreal episodes in 1958. In Toronto, Forman was replaced by Toby Tarnow for the 1961–1962 season.

== Scheduling ==
This 15-minute series was broadcast as follows:

Days	Time	Season run
Tuesdays, Wednesdays, Thursdays	3:45 p.m.	21 January to 17 April 1958
Weekdays	2:45 p.m.	29 September 1958 to 29 May 1959
Weekdays	2:15 p.m.	13 October 1959 to 29 April 1960
Weekdays	2:15 p.m.	17 October 1960 to 30 June 1961
Weekdays	2:15 p.m.	2 October 1961 to 29 June 1962
Weekdays	2:15 p.m.	15 October 1962 to 31 May 1963
