= Martine Allain-Regnault =

French scientific journalist (1937–2022)

- Born: 2 March 1937; Abbeville, France
- Died: 8 October 2022 (aged 85); Paris, France
- Education: University of Paris
- Occupation: Scientific journalist
- Employer: France Télévisions
- Children: 1

Martine Allain-Regnault (2 March 1937 – 8 October 2022) was a French scientific journalist and television presenter.

== Biography ==
Allain-Regnault spent her childhood in several French cities, following the assignments of her father, an engineer of the SNCF. She earned a degree in biology from the Faculty of Sciences of the University of Paris and subsequently completed graduate studies in physiology before performing studies on the alcohol consumption of rats. She was married and the mother of one daughter, Charlotte, born in 1970.

Allain-Regnault began her career in the written press. From 1962 to 1990, she was a scientific journalist for the magazine Science & Vie, writing the column Biologie, médecine et sciences naturelles. She was also a journalist for the daily newspaper Le Monde. At the same time, she was a health reporter for Antenne 2 from 1977 to 1987 and for TF1 from 1987 to 1992, for which she produced the show Viva la vie alongside Philippe Risoli from 1988 to 1989. She also co-produced and co-presented Télé calories with Frédéric Lepage. During this time, she presented multiple shows surrounding special events, such as the HIV/AIDS epidemic.

In the 1980s and 1990s, Allain-Regnault was a prominent media health specialist, creating a close bond with viewers after disclosing her own weight problems in the mid-1990s. From 1992 to 2004, she presented the television program Savoir plus santé on France 2 with François de Closets and Laurent Broomhead.

In 2002, her report Les petites chirurgies qui changent la vie on Savoir plus santé took home third prize at Telefilmed, an international festival of medical television programs.

Martine Allain-Regnault died on 8 October 2022 at the age of 85.

=== Official posts ===
On 19 January 1973, the Ministry of Public Health appointed Allain-Regnault to serve as a member of the terminology committee, replacing Claudine Escoffier-Lambiotte. On 23 February 1984, she joined the interdisciplinary committee for scientific information of the Ministry of Industry, replacing Jean Lacouture. On 9 March 2002, she was appointed a "member of the steering committee for actions to promote medical and medico-economic information" by the Ministry of Labour.

== Publications ==
- Un enfant vient de naître, problèmes d'hérédité (1965)
- L'élection présidentielle de mai 1974 : après la mort de Georges Pompidou (1974)
- Objectif cœur : Peut-on éviter les maladies cardio-vasculaires (1977)
- Télé Calories recettes (1991)
- Télé-calories La Bible des régimes (1993)
- Le chat Maine Coon (1995)
