= Claudine de La Tour-Turenne =

French lady-in-waiting

Claudine de La Tour-Turenne (1520–1591) was a lady-in-waiting of Marguerite de Valois (1553–1615), the spouse of the French king Henri IV (1553–1610). By birth, she was member of the House of La Tour d'Auvergne.

== Early life ==
She was born in 1520 as the eldest child of François II de la Tour, Vicomte de Turenne (1497-1532) and his second wife Anne de La Tour de Boulogne, Dame de Montgascon (1492-1530).

== Marriage ==
On October 31, 1535, Claudine married, at the age of 15, Justus II, seigneur of Tournon and count of Roussillon (1510–1557). They had a son and a number of daughters:

- Just Louis IV de Tournon, Count de Roussillon, Baron de Durteil (d. 1617), married Madeleine de La Rochefoucauld. They had two daughters:
  - Madeleine; married to Gaspard d'Alègre, Seigneur de Beauvoir; no issue
  - Francoise (b. 1621); married to Gaspard de Polignac, Vicomte de Polignac, Marquis de Chalencon (1579-1659). They were ancestors of Dukes of Polignac and House of Monaco.
- Claudine de Tournon-Roussillon (d. 1600), married Philibert de Rye, Count de Varax (d. 1597). They had at least six children:
  - Claude de Rye, baron of Balançon, appointed gentilhombre de la cámara to the Cardinal-Infant on 2 May 1635, married Claudine-Prospère de la Baume; daughters Madeleine and Eléonore were ladies-in-waiting to Isabella Clara Eugenia, sovereign of the Netherlands.
  - François de Rye, sumilher da cortina of the archdukes in 1606.
  - Christophe de Rye de La Palud, Count de Varax (d. 1637); married Eleonore de Chabot (1570–1618); had issue.
  - Anne-Marguerite de Rye, married Guillaume de Richardot, baron of Lembeek and later count of Galmaarden.
  - Antoinette de Rye, married Gaspar, the uncle of Ferdinand le Blanc d'Andelot
  - Alexandrine de Rye (1589–1666); married Count Leonhard II von Taxis (1594-1628). They were progenitors of the House of Thurn und Taxis.
- Hélène de Tournon, a maid of honour to Margeruite de Valois; died of a sudden illness as Marguerite and her retinue were traveling by boat through the bishopric of Liège.

== Legacy ==
It has been suggested that the references to "bright queen Margot" and "Claudine" in Mikhail Bulgakov's novel The Master and Margarita are references to Claudine, mother of a large family and widowed at 37, and Marguerite.
