= Claudine Prudencio =

Beninese politician

Claudine Afiavi Prudencio
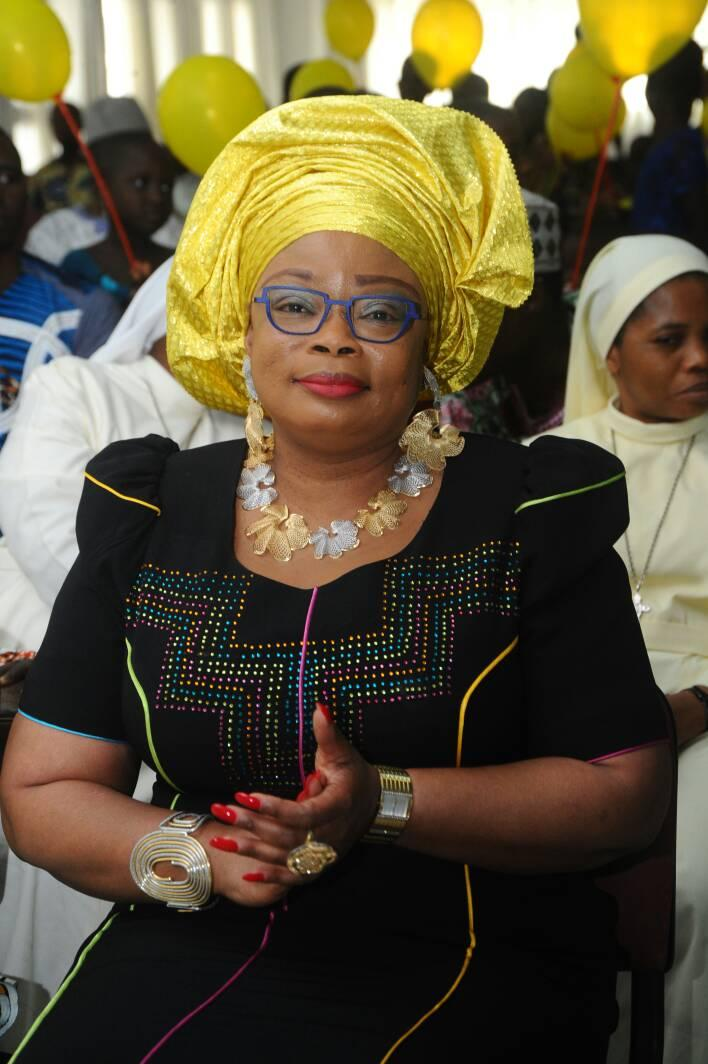
- Claudine Afiavi Prudencio
- Occupation: Minister

Claudine Afiavi Prudencio is a politician from Benin. She is the first president of the National Institute of Women of Benin, appointed to the Council of Ministers. President of the National Renewal Party (RN), she was a member of parliament and minister several times.

From October 2010 to June 2021, she was president of the UDBN.

Between 2010 and 2011, Prudencio was Minister of Crafts and Tourism.

Between 2011 and 2015, Prudencio was a member of the National Assembly (Benin), the first parliamentary secretary, and a member of the Pan-African Parliament.

Between 2015 and 2019, Prudencio was a member of the legislature, chair of the Committee on Education, Culture, Employment and Social Affairs, a member of the Pan-African Parliament, and a member of the Parliamentary Assembly of la Francophonie.

On December 11th 2024, Prudencio was appointed Minister-Counsellor of the President of the Republic of Benin in charge of Health.
