= Trial of Claudine de Culam =

16-year old French girl executed in 1601

Claudine de Culam
- Born: c. 1584/1585
- Died: 4 October 1601 (aged 16); Rognon, France
- Status: Executed by hanging
- Conviction: Carnal cohabitation with a dog
- Penalty: Death

Details
- Date apprehended: 7 September 1601

Claudine de Culam (c. 1584/1585 – 1601) was a 16-year-old French girl tried and hanged for allegedly committing the act of bestiality with a dog in Rognon, France.

== Accusation and arrest ==
On 7 September 1601, following a complaint from the public prosecutor of Rozay-en-Brie, the judge and the mayor of Rozay-en-Brie summoned Claudine to appear before them. She refused to voluntarily appear, so the court officers brought her into custody. The formal charge was carnal cohabitation with a dog.

When questioned about her name, age, and occupation, Claudine stated that her name was Claudine de Culam, a 16-year-old maid serving the prior of Revecourt. She also disclosed that she had been providing service to the prior for four years. The authorities asked her if she had carnal intercourse with a black-spotted white dog, which was shown to her. She replied that she did not know what that meant, and was taken to prison.

== Testimonial evidence ==
On 15 September, the witnesses who accused Claudine appeared and, after swearing to tell the truth, stated the following:

- The first witness was David Bonamy, a city innkeeper. He said that on the day of the feast of St. Louis, he went to visit the prior of Revecourt. Passing through the courtyard, he saw the maid in carnal copulation with the white dog. However, not daring to say anything to the prior, he spoke only to Jeanne Dubois, the widowed mother of Culam. Dubois did not want to believe him, maintaining that her daughter was too serious and innocent to do that and that he was probably mistaken.
- The second witness was Marie Neufbois, the wife of a blacksmith named Mathieu Gourdim. She declared that she saw Claudine indecently caressing and playing with the white dog between the hind legs at the end of August. Neufbois reproached Claudine for her attitude.
- The third witness was Nicolas Perrautelle, the prior's servant. He declared that on 1 September, en route to the prior's salon, he found Claudine lying on her bed, with the dog on top of her. But upon entering the salon, Claudine pushed the dog away and lowered her skirts. The dog kept insisting and trying to lift Claudine's skirts with its snout. Nicolas, approaching the animal, gave it a kick. From the blow, the dog went howling and limping away. Claudine shouted at him, "Why are you hitting my dog and getting mixed up in my affairs?!" After this, Nicolas replied that it was disgraceful that she let herself do such indecent activities.

On 17 September, Jeanne Dubois appeared in court and declared that her daughter was innocent, simple, and without malice. She maintained that envy drove the witnesses to testify against her. In regard to what Nicolas Perrautelle said, Dubois claimed that all the staff at the prior's house knew that he was in love with Claudine, but that Claudine never wanted to listen to him. After this, Jeanne asked the court to have her daughter examined by midwives and to report what happened.

== Evidence and reported confession ==
On September 21, the court issued an order to the midwife Jeanne L. Picarde (widow of Thomas Brehault), Genevieve (wife of apothecary André Girard), and Guillemeutte (wife of surgeon Michel F.), to examine Claudine and then report the results of the examination to the judges.

According to the testimony, the three women intended to visit Claudine in the room where she was caught with the dog. After having undressed Claudine to check if she had slept with a man previously, the dog reportedly jumped on her and attempted intercourse with her. The women believed it was thus confirmed that Claudine and the dog had sexual intercourse and that "there would again have been a new coupling at that moment if they had not acted to prevent it", after which the three women made Claudine get dressed and wrote their report.

On 22 October, brought before her judges, and after having the witnesses' statements and the report of the three midwives read to her, Claudine reportedly got down on her knees and confessed to having had carnal cohabitation with the dog and that she deserved to be punished, then adding that she was three months pregnant. She begged the court to postpone the trial and execution until she had given birth (equivalent to the practice of pleading the belly in contemporaneous English law), after which the judges sent the accused to prison in accordance with the conclusions of the public prosecutor.

== Judgement ==
The court ordered the examination of Claudine by the three midwives to determine whether her pregnancy was true; the report was negative, and in fact they reported that they had never seen a vulva so maltreated as this one. Claudine was convicted as guilty of the crime of having carnally cohabited with the dog, and the sentence was that she should be strangled and burnt alive in the great square of the village of Rognon with her ashes thrown to the wind. Her personal property was to be confiscated, deducting however, the sum of ten pounds fine to the king. This sentence was passed on the 4 October 1601.

The court of Parliament ordered that Claudine would "be hanged on the gallows in the great square of Rognon, together with the dog, and that the corpses of both should then be cast into the fire with their ashes spread to the wind so that no possible trace might be left of their misdeeds, so that mankind might not be reminded of their monstrous misdeeds."

== See also ==
- Thomas Granger
