= Claudine Vallerand =

Canadian television presenter

- Born: Claudine Simard; 8 October 1908; Montreal, Quebec, Canada
- Died: 16 September 2001 (aged 92); Longueuil, Quebec, Canada
- Occupations: Teacher; Television presenter
- Spouse: René D. Vallerand
- Children: 4

Claudine Vallerand (née Simard; 8 October 1908 – 16 September 2001) was a Canadian radio and television host. Considered a pioneer in preschool education and educational television, she opened the first private nursery school in Quebec.

== Personal life and family ==
Claudine Simard was born in Montreal on 8 October, 1908, to Marie-Antoinette Boyer (1876–1936) and Georges-Aimé Simard (1869–1953). Her father was a pharmacist and businessman who was elected to the Legislative Council of Quebec for the Repentigny division from 1913 to 1921 and again from 1923 until his death.

Simard married René D. Vallerand in 1930. They had four children: Claude, Suzanne, Lucie, and Louis.

Claudine Vallerand died 16 September, 2001, following a long illness.

== Career ==
Vallerand opened the first nursery school in Quebec in 1938. The following year, she established École des Parents, an association formed to spread a family-orientated approach to childhood learning. Early supporters included Thérèse Gouin Décarie, André Laurendeau, Réginald Boisvert, and Michel Chartrand. École des Parents advocated for families to abandon the church-run boarding schools in favour of raising and educating their children themselves. Vallerand believed that the parent should be the primary educator for children and that families could do a better job in terms of education than a school could. As a resource for parents, École des Parents focused on educating parents in how to teach their young children as opposed to disciplining them and inundating them with complex topics like philosophy. Vallerand's beliefs towards education – promoting natural interests rather than formal instruction – were influenced by the Montessori education method. Vallerand spread her teachings through public speaking appearances, letters to magazines, and through a daily advice column hosted in Le Devoir between 1948 and 1955.

Vallerand hosted Le Courrier de Radio-Parents for Radio-Canada. From 1955 to 1962, Vallerand played the titular character Madame Fon Fon on the show Fon Fon. As Madame Fon Fon, Vallerand also appeared in segments for Nursery School Time for CBC Television in 1958.

Vallerand recorded several renditions of children's songs for Radio-Canada in the 1950s with pianist Pierre Brabant and fellow children's performer Tante Lucille. The songs were published in six albums collected together as Contes de Maman Fon Fon.
