= Claudine Stirling =

New Zealand isotope geochemist

Claudine Stirling FRSNZ
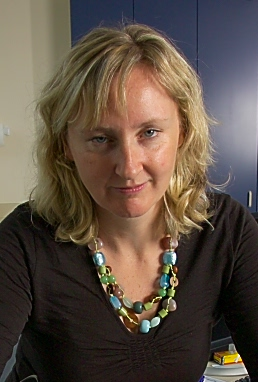
- Stirling in 2007
- Education: Australian National University
- Scientific career
- Fields: Isotope geochemistry
- Workplaces: University of Michigan; ETH Zürich; University of Otago
- Thesis: High-precision U-series dating of corals from Western Australia : implication for last interglacial sea-levels (1996)

Claudine Helen Stirling FRSNZ is a New Zealand isotope geochemistry academic. As of 2018, she is a full professor at the University of Otago. In 2024 she was elected as a Fellow of the Royal Society Te Apārangi.

== Academic career ==
After a 1996 PhD titled 'High-precision U-series dating of corals from Western Australia : implication for last interglacial sea-levels' at the Australian National University, Stirling worked at University of Michigan and ETH Zürich before moving to the University of Otago in 2006, rising to full professor in 2018. Prof Stirling is a member of the Department of Geology with current research interests including: isotope geochemistry, biogeochemical cycles of trace metals, paleoceanography & paleoclimatology, and environmental geochemistry.

In 2024 Stirling was elected as a Fellow of the Royal Society Te Apārangi.

== Selected works ==
- Halliday, Alex N., Der-Chuen Lee, John N. Christensen, Mark Rehkämper, Wen Yi, Xiaozhong Luo, Chris M. Hall, Chris J. Ballentine, Thomas Pettke, and Claudine Stirling. "Applications of multiple collector-ICPMS to cosmochemistry, geochemistry, and paleoceanography." Geochimica et Cosmochimica Acta 62, no. 6 (1998): 919–940.
- Amelin, Yuri, Angela Kaltenbach, Tsuyoshi Iizuka, Claudine H. Stirling, Trevor R. Ireland, Michail Petaev, and Stein B. Jacobsen. "U–Pb chronology of the Solar System's oldest solids with variable 238U/235U." Earth and Planetary Science Letters 300, no. 3-4 (2010): 343–350.
- Stirling, Claudine H., Morten B. Andersen, Emma-Kate Potter, and Alex N. Halliday. "Low-temperature isotopic fractionation of uranium." Earth and Planetary Science Letters 264, no. 1-2 (2007): 208–225.
- Gutjahr, Marcus, Martin Frank, Claudine H. Stirling, Veronika Klemm, Tina Van de Flierdt, and Alex N. Halliday. "Reliable extraction of a deepwater trace metal isotope signal from Fe–Mn oxyhydroxide coatings of marine sediments." Chemical Geology 242, no. 3-4 (2007): 351–370.
- Rehkämper, Mark, Maria Schönbächler, and Claudine H. Stirling. "Multiple collector ICP‐MS: Introduction to instrumentation, measurement techniques and analytical capabilities." Geostandards Newsletter 25, no. 1 (2001): 23–40.
