= Claudine Weiher =

American archivist (1941–2012)

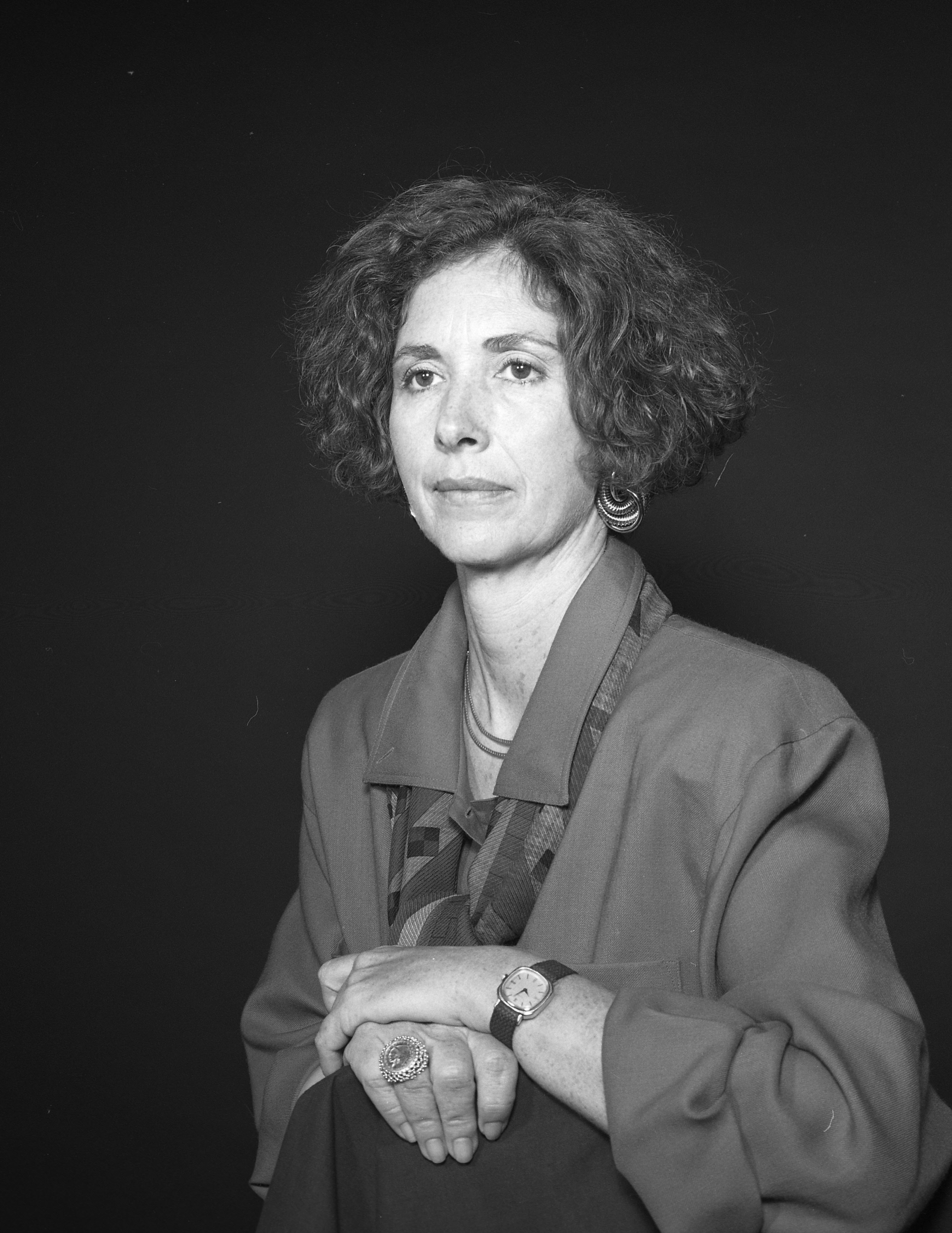
Claudine Weiher in 1985

Claudine Jackson Weiher (November 24, 1941 – October 13, 2012) served as Acting Deputy Archivist of the United States from 1986 to 1987 and Deputy Archivist of the United States from 1988 to 1993.

Weiher was born in Kansas City, Missouri. She earned her B.S. at the University of Missouri in 1963 and her M.A. at Georgetown University in 1967.

In 1966, Weiher began working at the National Archives and Records Services (NARS), now known as the National Archives and Records Administration (NARA), and served as Acting Deputy Archivist of the United States from 1986 to 1987 and Deputy Archivist of the United States from 1988 to 1992.

At the beginning of Weiher's tenure, the National Archives and Records Services was combined with the General Services Administration. Under the leadership of sixth Archivist of the United States Robert M. Warner, Weiher worked for the independence of the National Archives from the General Services Administration by writing testimony and preparing strategy.

After some Congressional battles, on October 19, 1984, President Ronald Reagan signed Senate Bill 905, which established the National Archives and Records Administration as an independent agency.

With the aim of helping preserve records, Weiher established "clean" reading rooms in the National Archives and Records Administration – meaning pencils only and limited bags and coats. Many researchers objected to the reduction in access, but the measures were put in place to reduce the theft of documents.

Weiher served as Deputy Archivist under Archivist Don W. Wilson, and was a visible Deputy who often spoke to the media. In November 1992, the Senate Governmental Affairs Committee criticized Wilson as an "absentee archivist" and credited Weiher with effectively running NARA. Wilson replaced Weiher a few weeks later, detailing her to the position of Assistant Archivist for Special and Regional Archives.
