= Claudine Escoffier-Lambiotte =

Belgian medical doctor and journalist

Claudine Escoffier-Lambiotte (16 July 1923 – 4 January 1996) was a Belgian medical doctor and journalist who oversaw the medical section of French newspaper Le Monde for over thirty years.

Escoffier-Lambiotte obtained three medical degrees from universities in Brussels, Paris, and Columbia University in New York. She received her doctorate from Columbia in 1947 and served as a resident in obstetrics and gynecology at the Sloane Hospital for Women from 1948 to 1950. In 1956, she was chosen by Hubert Beuve-Méry to help create a daily medical section in Le Monde, which she directed until 1988. She started a weekly medical supplement to Le Monde in 1967 and was responsible for the hiring of scientific journalist Martine Allain-Regnault.

She was a Knight of the Legion of Honour, an Officer of the Order of Leopold, and an Officer of the Order of Merit. She and Allain-Regnault were awarded a scientific information prize from the French Academy of Sciences in 1988.
