= Claudine Brunand =

French engraver (1630–1674)

Claudine Brunand (1630 in Lyon – 1674) was a French poet and engraver, who had learned the art of engraving from her father, Aymé Brunand.

Brunand was likely related to the woodcutter Michel Brunand. She worked for several printers and publishers in her native Lyon as well as in Germany. She remained unmarried but was able to earn a living with a profession that was dominated by men. At first, Brunand's oeuvre consisted only of commissions for portraits and frontispieces.

In 1670, she illustrated the life of Teresa of Avila with 56 engravings in a work entitled La Vie de la Seraphique Mere Sainte Terese de Jesus, Fondatrice des Carmes Déchaussez & des Carmelites Déchaussées. En Figures, & en Vers François & Latins. Avec un Abbregé de l’Histoire, une Reflexion Morale, & une Resolution Chrestienne sur châque Figure. Brunand also made heraldic paintings.

== Biography ==
Baptized on December 9 or December 30, 1630, in Lyon, she was the daughter of Aimé Brunand.

Pierre Ménestrier describes her as a “girl from Lyon”. Active in the city during the second half of the 17th century, she produced engravings of sound technical quality, though her drawings were often clumsy.

In addition to engraving, she practiced illumination and heraldic painting and wrote pre-Feminism texts.

It is believed that he was buried on July 10, 1674, at Saint-Michel Church.

== Bibliography ==
- Véronique Meyer, « Claudine Brunand, femme et graveuse », Nouvelles de l’estampe [online], 263 (2020), https://journals.openedition.org/estampe/1437.
