= Rognon, Doubs =

Rognon
- Commune
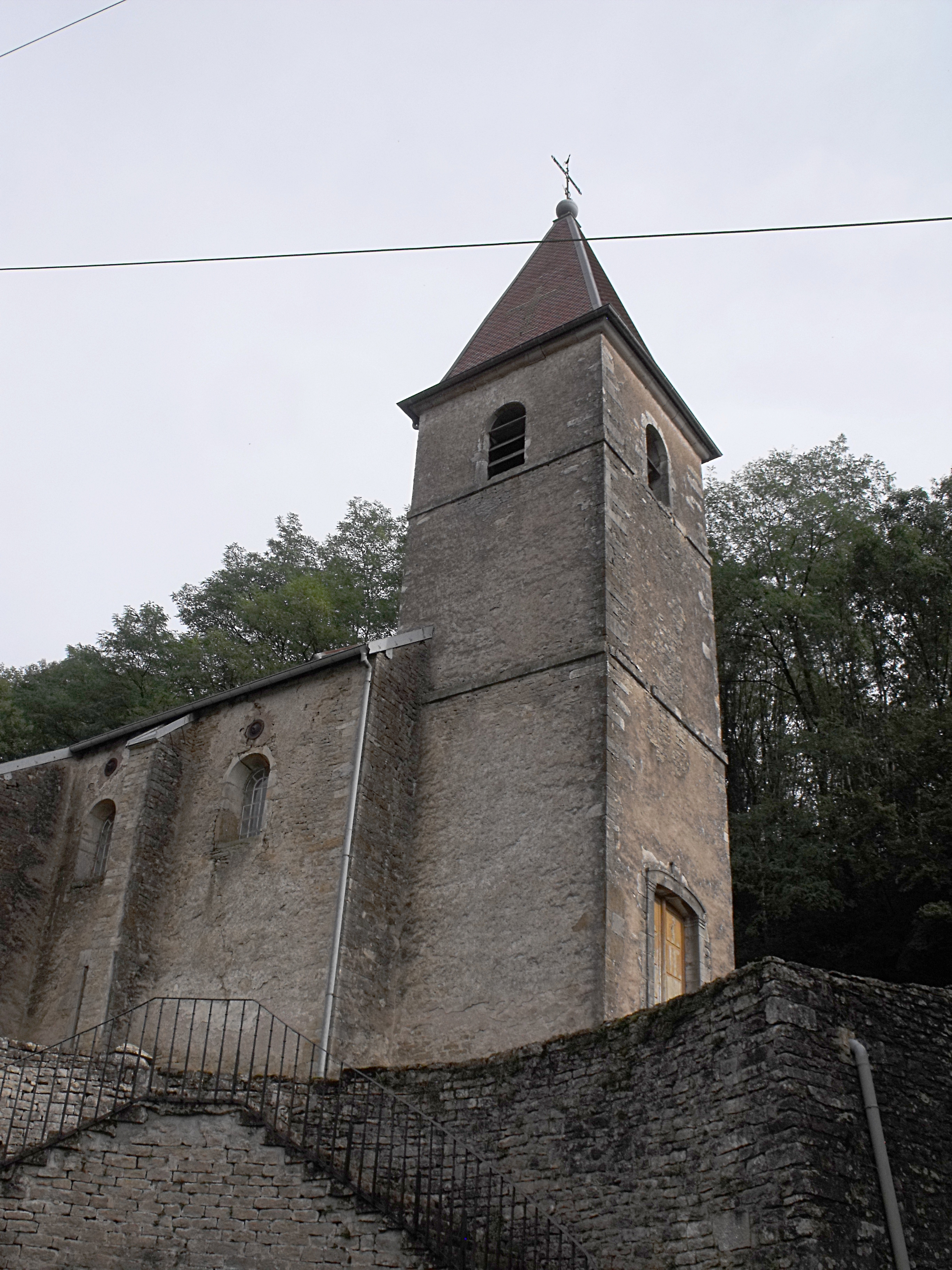
- The church in Rognon
- Location of Rognon
- Location within France Location within Bourgogne-Franche-Comté
- Coordinates: 47°25′32″N 6°18′46″E
- Country: France
- Region: Bourgogne-Franche-Comté
- Department: Doubs
- Arrondissement: Besançon
- Canton: Baume-les-Dames

Government
  - Mayor (2020–2026): David Postif
- Area^{1}: 4.09 km^{2} (1.58 sq mi)
- Highest elevation: 445 m (1,460 ft)
- Lowest elevation: 259 m (850 ft)
- Population (2023): 44
  - Density: 11/km^{2} (28/sq mi)
- Time zone: UTC+01:00 (CET)
  - Summer (DST): UTC+02:00 (CEST)
- INSEE/Postal code: 25498 /25680
- ^{1} French Land Register data, which excludes lakes, ponds, glaciers > 1 km^{2} (0.386 sq mi or 247 acres) and river estuaries.

Rognon (French pronunciation: [ʁɔɲɔ̃]) is a commune in the Doubs department in the Bourgogne-Franche-Comté region in eastern France.

== Geography ==
Rognon lies 9 km (5.6 mi) from Rougemont.

== Population ==
Historical population
Year	Pop.	±% p.a.
1968	45	—
1975	56	+3.17%
1982	70	+3.24%
1990	55	−2.97%
1999	44	−2.45%
2007	46	+0.56%
2012	49	+1.27%
2017	48	−0.41%
2023	44	−1.44%
Source: INSEE

== See also ==
- Communes of the Doubs department
