= Albert Edouard Gilou =

Albert Edouard Gilou (1910-1961) was a French art collector and founding art director of the magazine Connaissance des Arts. He was also art director of the magazine Réalités from 1950 to 1961.

== Early life and education ==
Gilou was a descendant of Charles Sedelmeyer on his mother's side, and his father, Pierre Gilou, was a tennis player who captained the French Tennis Federation and won the Davis Cup five times. Gilou was raised in a highly motivating environment, and was given art and music lessons.

In 1939, Gilou graduated from the Paris École des Beaux-Arts with a degree in architecture. He was awarded two medals in drawing and sculpture modelling.

== Career ==
During World War II, Gilou served as a naval officer, and in 1940, he joined General de Gaulle and the "France Libre" on a staff mission. In 1942, he enlisted in the FNFL (Flotte Nationale de la France Libre, the French Resistance Navy), where he became an Officer Interpreter for the Cipher Services (ORIC).

In 1945, Pierre Lazareff, chief editor of the daily France-Soir, decided to create a new monthly news magazine, Réalités, with its first issue dated February 1946. After collaborating regularly with the magazine as an art counselor and critic, Gilou became art director of Réalités in 1950.

Gilou considered photography as an art in its own right and hired many photographers to produce photographs for Réalités. These included Edouard Boubat, Henri Cartier-Bresson, Robert Capa, David Seymour, Werner Bischof, Bruce Davidson, Dennis Stock, Eugene Smith, Robert Doisneau, Brassaï, Manuel Alvarez Bravo, William Klein, Irving Penn, and Richard Avedon.

In 1951, Gilou created a monthly art magazine called Connaisseur des Arts—renamed to Connaissance des Arts in 1952. Francis Spar was its managing editor, while Gilou was its art director.

Gilou also directed the creation of the Réalités collection of art reference books. He always responded favourably to invitations to speak at conferences or to lead art workshops, giving lectures and courses at the Institut Supérieur des Beaux-Arts of Besançon (Doubs, France) in 1958.

Gilou was also an enthusiastic art collector. During the last years of his life, he collected art pieces that were oriented towards spirituality and its various expressions in art: Chinese paintings and sculptures, Japanese zen portraits, Persian paintings, Christian Byzantine and Mosan art, and archaïc Greek sculptures.

In 1960, the French Ministry of Culture supported Gilou's project to establish a collection of French religious architecture and art, but Gilou's brutal and accidental death in 1961 put an end to the ambitious project.

== Personal life ==
Gilou was married to Miriam Gilou-Cendrars, the daughter and biographer of the writer and poet Blaise Cendrars. They had three children.
