= Léon Herschtritt =

French photographer (1936–2020)

- Born: 4 May 1936; Paris, France
- Died: 21 November 2020 (aged 84); Paris, France
- Occupation: Photographer

Léon Herschtritt (4 May 1936 – 21 November 2020) was a French humanist photographer. He won the Niépce Prize as a young photographer in 1960.

== Early life and education ==
Born in Paris 4 May 1936, Herschtritt was imprisoned as a child at the Drancy internment camp during World War II and the German occupation. His family escaped deportation due to his father's British nationality. Undertook his secondary education at the Lycée Voltaire. At fifteen he used his father's Leica to photograph chateaux in the Loire. From 1954 he spent six months at the Vaugirard School, Paris, before studying at the École Nationale Supérieure de la Photographie.

He was mobilized into the Air Force for the Algerian War in 1957–9 before touring other parts of Africa, as photography detaché for Education Nationale, while also documenting his experiences with awareness of the political context and a humanist perspective.

== Photographer ==
Having returned from Algeria with copious photographs, in 1960 Herschtritt published them in his first photo book, titled Les Gosses d'Algérie, which was featured in the magazine Réalités, and exhibited at the Maison des Beaux-Arts in Paris, for which he won the Niépce Prize that same year. He became active throughout the 1960s, a freelancer having obtained his press card in 1962, and was part of the humanist photography movement. He worked first for the American movie industry on The Longest Day (1962) and Cleopatra (1963) before concentrating on socio-political subjects: Christmas in Berlin, strikes at Decazeville, Italian peasants, and old age.

Herschtritt carried out a three-month long mission in Sub-Saharan Africa at the request of the Ministry of Cooperation in 1963. He took thousands of photographs on decolonization which were published in the ministry's library, and were exhibited at the Musée de l'Homme before circulating across France and internationally.

While in Paris, Herschtritt worked as a reporter-photographer for L'Obs, La Vie, and Réalités before becoming a freelance photographer and Paris correspondent for Camera Press agency in London 1964-71 which distributes his photos of Africa to over 50 countries. He produced publications on a number of subjects; Israel (1962), Berlin Wall (1963), Women (1960/1974), Gypsies (1966), Lovers of Paris (1960/1965), Politics (1960/1970), Gamins of Paris (1960/1965).

In 1966, at 30 years of age, he was awarded the Gens d’Images for his books Au hasard des femmes, and on prostitution, La célébration des putains, and was profiled in a television program Chambre Noir hosted by Albert Plécy (founder of Gens d’Images) and Michel Tournier. The following year his work was selected for the survey show Tendance de la jeune photographie française at the Bibliothèque Nationale de France. He was a member of the Paris photo club Les 30 x 40, where he was also one of the outspoken young guard, and there exhibited his photographs of the demonstrations of May 1968. His work appeared in Karl Pawek's 1968 second World Exhibition of Photography, devoted to women, and his solo exhibition was shown at FNAC. That year, he was photographer on an advertisement campaign for Olivetti in France, Sweden, Denmark and Belgium.

His portraits (1960/1970), presented with texts by Hervé Le Goff and Jean-Noël Gurgand, and design by David Laranjeira, include Karen Blissen, Jacques Chirac, Catherine Deneuve, Marguerite Duras, Valéry Giscard d'Estaing, Serge Gainsbourg, Charles de Gaulle, Pierre Mendès-France, Eugène Ionesco, François Mitterrand, Georges Pompidou, Jean-Paul Sartre, Jean Seberg, Mapie de Toulouse-Lautrec.

In 1969 and 1970, in addition to his photo-reportage, he made films; for British television, a piece on the French presidential elections; co-directing two commercial shorts on Le Mans, and horse racing; directing, with his wife, a short colour documentary on the reunification of Jerusalem; and in 1973, a production for French television La tête de l’homme.

== Collector and patron of photography ==
With his wife, Nicole, Herschtritt managed Le Bistrot de Montmartre in 1974 where every month he organised shows; forty over four years. The café became a meeting place for Parisian photographers. In 1976, until 1993, Herschtritt stopped taking photographs to trade as an antique dealer at the Saint-Ouen flea market, and to build a collection of classic images and cameras, and in 1991 he opened photography gallery at the market.

He continued to promote photography; a 1983 show in Vienne on the portrait toured through France; he commissioned in 1996 Le PLM d’Edouard Baldus; and edited the book Jamais deux fois le même regard on the photographs in his private collection. In 1998, he and his son launched Galerie Laurent Herschtritt in Saint Germain des Près. At 65, also with son Laurent, he organised one of the first auctions of photojournalism including pictures by James Nachtwey, Henri Cartier Bresson, Robert Capa, and Robert Doisneau, in November 2001 at the Salle Drouot. A second 'Photojournalism at Auction' in 2002 was followed by an important sale of prints by Nadar. In 2004 and 2005 he and Nicole took over from his son Laurent and renamed their space Galerie Nicole et Léon Herschtritt, showing Paris nostalgia, American photography, and masterpieces of the 19th century.

Inclusion in a 2006 group exhibition at the Bibliothèque Nationale marked Herschtritt's 50th year in photography and in 2012 a limited edition Léon Herschtritt, photographies was published. The following year he travelled to Florida to launch his solo show at the Foosaner Art Museum.

Léon Herschtritt died in Paris on 21 November 2020 at the age of 84.

== Selected exhibitions ==
- 1960 Les Gosses d'Algerie Maison des Beaux-Arts, Paris (solo)
- 1960 Les Amoureux de Paris, Studio 28, Paris (solo)
- 1961 Salon international du portrait photographique, Bibliothèque nationale, Galeries Mazarine et Mansart (group)
- 1963 Afrique Musee de !'Homme, Paris (group)
- 1967 Tendance de la Jeune Photographie, Bibliothèque Nationale, Paris (group)
- 1968 L'Homme et la Machine, FNAC, Paris (solo)
- 1968 Mai 68, Maison de la Culture Mouffetard, Paris (group)
- 1968 2nd World Exhibition of Photography (group)
- 1968 PARIS, MAI 68, Club des 30x40, Paris (group)
- 1983 Musee de la Photo, Vienne, France (solo)
- 2008, 18 Nov – 28 Nov, Nie zweimal derselbe Blick - Berlin 1961, Galerie im Parlament/Abgeordnetenhaus Be, DE (solo)
- 2008, 3 Nov – 30 Nov, Nie zweimal derselbe Blick - Paris 60’s, Institut Francais, DE (solo)
- 2008, 18 Dec 2008 – 7 Feb 2009, Portraits d'artistes: les grandes figures du XXe siècle devant l'objectif, with Eve Arnold, Robert Doisneau, Gilles Ehrmann, Gisèle Freund, Ara Güler, Mark Lacroix, Inge Morath, Marc Riboud, Willy Ronis, André Villers, Reinhart Wolf, & others, Galerie Verdeau, FR (group)
- 2009, 30 Apr – 1 Jun, Léon Herschtritt, Monographie, Pavillon sud de la caserne de Bonne, FR (solo)
- 2009, 30 Apr – 1 Jun, Léon Herschtritt, Monographie, Ancien Musée de Peinture, FR (solo)
- 2009, 8 Jun – 27 Jun, Le Mur, Berlin 1961, institut français, DE (solo)
- 7 Jul – 13 Sep 2009, Rencontres d'Arles, FR (group)
- 2009, 7 Nov – 12 Dec, Berlin, Le mur, Noël 1961, Galerie Seine 51, FR (solo)
- 2011, 10 Feb – 12 Mar, Léon Herschtritt Carte Blanche, Galerie Seine 51, FR (solo)
- 2013 Foosaner Art Museum, Florida, USA (solo)
- 2016, 18 Jun – 18 Sep, Léon Herschtritt, The end of an era, Musée Nicéphore, FR (solo)
- 2016, 6 Dec – 23 Dec, A life for photography!, Esther Woerdehoff, FR (solo)
- 2017, 27 Mar – 25 Jun, Les Amoureux de Paris, Galerie La Belle Juliette, FR (solo)
- 2017, 7 Oct – 3 Nov, Lebensszenen ll with Holger Biermann, Hannah Goldstein, Manfred Paul, Angelika Platen, Galerie Franzkowiak, DE (group)
- 2018, 3 Feb – 3 May, Amoureux, Galerie La Belle Juliette, FR (group)

== Awards ==
- Niépce Prize (1960)
- Prix Gens d'Images (1966)

== Publications ==
- Au hasard des femmes (1966)
- La célébration des putains, selon l’Ancien et le Nouveau Testament (1968)
- Portfolio de 10 photographies sur le thème du couple (1974)
- Jamais deux fois le même regard (1996)
- Die Mauer, Berlin 1961 (2009)
- Léon Herschtritt, photographies (2012)
