= Yvette Troispoux =

French photographer

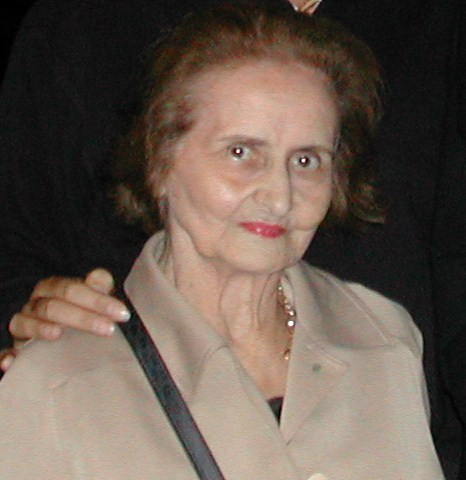
Yvette Troispoux in 2001

Yvette Troispoux (1914–2007) was a French photographer known as the "photographer of photographers" for her pictures taken unobtrusively at photography exhibitions and social events. Her extensive body of work, built up over seventy years, also includes photographs of people in everyday settings in the "humanist” tradition. After her death, the French National Library acquired her archives for its collections.

== Early life ==
She was born on 1 June 1914 to a middle-class family in Coulommiers. When she was nineteen she used her savings to buy an Agfa box camera that allowed her to make 6cm x 9cm prints. The first shot she took was in a local park, the Parc des Capucins. Soon after that, the self-taught young woman entered a local photography competition and won first prize: a Kodak Pronto. One of her best-known photographs from these early years, and her most treasured, is the picture of her brother Jean at Montparnasse railway station before he left for Algeria. He was killed on military service there in 1939. Her father had died not long before.

== Photography ==
Troispoux remained a committed but amateur photographer for forty years. While following her mother's wishes by working in an office job, she moved to Paris and did not give up her enthusiasm for her craft. In 1953 she joined the Club Photographique de Paris, known ironically as Les 30x40 after a rule about the size of print allowed at national competitions, and in its meetings was an outspoken and principled younger member. From then on she amassed a series of portraits of the photographers who met at the club and elsewhere. In 1958 she acquired a Leica equipped with a fast Summarit lens, which enabled her to work as she wanted, without flash. She became known for turning up with a Leica and a couple of shopping bags at most major events in Parisian photography, and was called the “photographer of photographers”.

Her photographs are not all from the artistic world of private views and gatherings of celebrated photographers. Many are images of ordinary human beings going about their lives: on the banks of the Seine, or in the countryside. Commentators have suggested she created “poetic shots full of tenderness” or a “delicate poetry” comparable to work by Édouard Boubat. In this, she belonged to the humanist photography movement.

In 1971 she got recognition from fellow artists when she won the Paris photography society's Grand Prix. The first exhibition to bring Troispoux wider public attention was at Galerie Odéon-Photos in 1982. The 1990s confirmed her reputation and achievement. First, a 1990 exhibition at the Agathe Gaillard Gallery showed off her work as "photographer of photographers". Two years later she was featured in the Paris Mois de la Photo (photography month) 1992, and in 1993 she was made an Officer of L'Ordre des Arts et des Lettres, a national honour recognising significant contributions to the arts.

Her friendship with Agathe Gaillard, owner of a pioneering photography gallery, began in the 1970s and was an important thread running through her photographic career. Gaillard's private views attracted numerous famous photographers, and Troispoux was well-placed to capture shots of people like Gisèle Freund, Brassaï, and Robert Doisneau who called her his photocopine (photofriend). The 1990 exhibition celebrated 15 years of the gallery's existence by showing Troispoux’ collection of portraits, many of them informal images of photographers in a social setting. Gaillard described her friend's work as a “passionate and ironic chronicle of forty years of our life, for us, people who love photography”. For Troispoux’ 90th birthday, Gaillard asked her to make her own selection of the pictures that mattered most to her for a Rétrospective les 90 ans d'Yvette Troispoux (2004). In the same year she was feted at the Rencontres d'Arles photography festival, where she went every year. She is generally described as someone with an appealing personality, a warm nature and a free spirit.

== Legacy ==
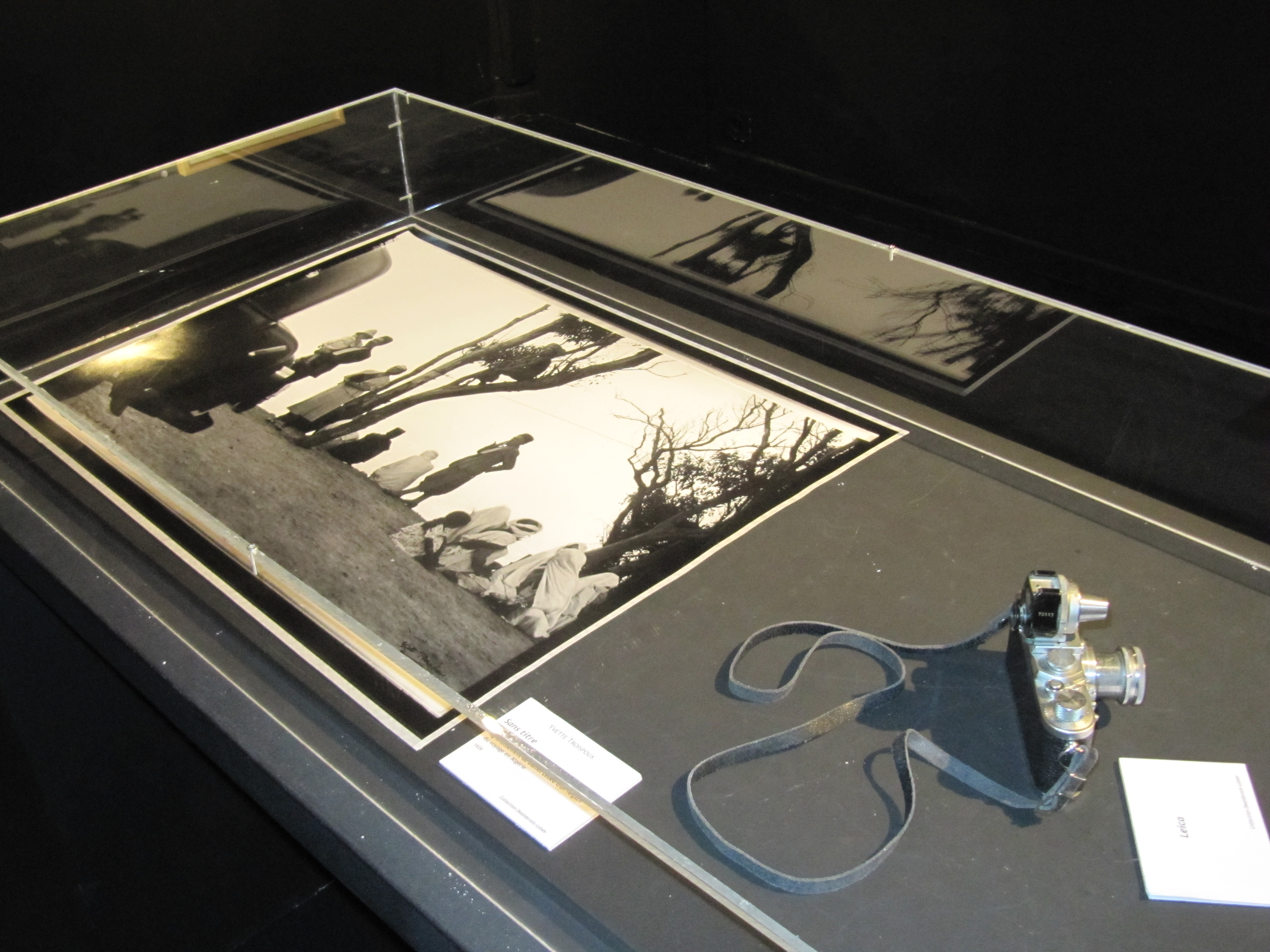
An exhibit at the 2012 retrospective with a photograph taken on a journey to Algeria to bring Jean Troispoux' body home.

Troispoux died on 11 September 2007 at the age of 93. When her archives were offered at auction in 2008, the French National Library (Bibliothèque nationale de France, also known as BnF) exercised its right to acquire them in order to prevent their dispersal, since they considered these archives to have a special importance in the history of photography in France in the second half of the 20th century. Well-wishers and friends who were present applauded this moment in the saleroom. The library now owns all her negatives and contact sheets, her personal archives and a series of her early photographs. Gaillard bought several classic Troispoux photographs at the auction and donated them to the BnF department of prints in memory of their creator. A researcher was funded for a year to work with the collection, and this led to the publication of Mademoiselle Yvette Troispoux by Céline Gautier and Aurélie Aujard (Contrejour 2012). In the same year a retrospective exhibition at the Musée du Montparnasse invited a range of Troispoux' photographer friends to select their own personal favourites from the collection for public viewing.
