= Gilles Ehrmann =

French photographer and photojournalist (1928–2005)

- Born: Pierre Germain Ehrmann; September 3, 1928; Metz
- Died: May 27, 2005 (aged 76); Paris
- Education: École nationale supérieure des arts décoratifs
- Known for: Réalités photographer
- Notable work: Les Inspirés et leurs demeures
- Movement: Surrealism, Humanist photography
- Children: Sabine (daughter)
- Parents: Paul Georges Ehrmann (father); Catherine Berthe Kirschmann (mother)
- Awards: Nadar Prize, 1963

Gilles Ehrmann was the pseudonym of French photographer and photojournalist Pierre Germain Ehrmann, who was born in Metz (Moselle) 3 September 1928 and died May 27, 2005, in the 15th arrondissement of Paris. Active 1950–2005, he published in major magazines, associated with the Surrealists, especially André Breton, exhibited frequently over five decades, and produced several books. His main themes were architecture, landscape and photojournalism.

== Early life ==
Pierre Germain Ehrmann was the son of Catherine Berthe Kirschmann (born in 1891 in Fontoy), and Paul Georges Ehrmann (born in 1894 in Metz), a secretary, and was the younger brother of flautist Huguette Ehrmann (1926–1990). From 1934 to 1940 he attended primary school in Metz and his secondary education, over 1940–45, was in Avignon where during World War II, Gilles Ehrmann took refuge with his mother while his father remained in Lorraine, a member of a Resistance network.

== Performer ==
In Avignon, Ehrmann made his stage debut, performing in Werther and as an extra in Carmen.

From 1946 to 1955, Ehrmann studied at the École nationale supérieure des arts décoratifs in Paris. He founded an avant-garde theatre troupe called "Ceux-là." From these years, he encountered surrealism through the friends of Jacques Hérold, particularly the poet Ghérasim Luca, who he met in 1952 and with whom he collaborated on several publications. He began a film, never completed, La Rue Plage, in 16mm, for which he was producer, screenwriter, and director.

== Photographer ==
From 1950 Ehrmann worked in photography using a large-format camera, the Thornton Picard. In 1955, he illustrated the book by writer and poet André Verdet, Noir Provence, whose cover was designed by Picasso. In 1956, Verdet again approached him for a book on Saint-Paul-de-Vence, with which Jacques Prévert collaborated and where, at the Hôtel La Colombe d'or, Ehrmann took portraits of Picasso, Chagall, etc. From 1956 he began collaborating with the magazine L'Architecture d'aujourd'hui thanks to meeting and photographing the work of constructivist and neo-plasticist sculptor André Bloc who founded the journal in 1930. That year he photographed in the USSR for Editions du Cercle d'Art, and for Jacques Lanzmann's unpublished book. In 1959 he documented Jean Benoît's surrealist performance L'Exécution du testament du marquis de Sade at the Librairie Claude Oterelo, Paris, a series exhibited in 1996 and 2005.

=== Réalités ===
In 1956, or 1958, he met Jacques Dumons, artistic director since April 1954 of the magazine Réalités, and began regular collaborations with the magazine for reports on "La Jalousie," for which he staged three actors to produce a plausible documentary illustration; "Les Européens" (1958); "République de Guinée" (1958); "La Chance" (1960); "La Prison" (1960); "La mère de famille," (1961) etc. Also for Réalités, he produced three reports on theatre, appreciation of which he had rediscovered thanks to the choreographer Maurice Béjart.

Through his love of art and poetry and his association with the Surrealists —Jacques Prévert, who from c.1958 incorporated Ehrmann's photographs (some cut from Réalités) in his photocollages, and André Breton in particular—he created enigmatic imagery for Réalités, often architectural views, landscapes ("Terres inviolées de l'équinoxe", November 1962; "3 o'clock in the morning at the polar circle"; August 1963; "Cendres, laves et pumices", September 1964), and compositions beyond straight reportage, many of them reproduced as double-page spreads.

Through dramatic compositions and photo-essays he conveyed a humanist empathy; "The Fate of Black Africa Is Being Played Out in Its Slums" (November 1959); or "Innocent, Justice Condemns Me" (November 1960); and the distress of Breton families in the Côtes d'Armor ("The Breton Calvary," August 1961),

As noted by his associate the Belgian architect André Jacqmain, Ehrmann's architectural photography is innovative; one view (Réalités, November 1958) depicting the vault under construction for the National Center for Defense Industries and Techniques (CNIT), is made a geometric abstraction, and serene water reflections and aerial perspective effects mute the brute forms of an industrial site that appears in John Rothenstein's 1964 The World of Camera. Ehrmann continued to publish in Réalités beyond 1965 including "Le Living Theatre", 1967.

=== Photobooks ===
Ehrmann's major book, Les Inspirés et leurs demeures ("The Inspired and Their Abodes"), a study of visionary builders that was published in 1962, is a collector's item. From 1956 to 1960, Ehrmann, often accompanied by his poet friends, created a collection of images and stories about these builders Gaston Chaissac, Fréderic Séron, Hyppolite Massé and Joseph Marmin, and images of their creations such as Palais Idéal of Ferdinand Cheval, the Rochers Sculptés by Abbé Fouré or the Maison Picassiette by Raymond Isidore, and the Bomarzo gardens in Italy. He visited the Palais idéal with Ghérasim Luca, the house of Raymond Isidore with Bréton, and Chaissac with Benjamin Péret, combining encounters, real or fictional, between poets of the written word and those of the built space to create a kind of osmosis between worlds considered parallel and to solicit, from his surrealist friends, the texts that would later accompany his photographs in the book, the first substantial work on the subject. It includes previously unpublished texts by Benjamin Péret, Gherasim Luca and Claude Tarnaud, and is prefaced by André Breton. The latter evokes the visionary gesture of these “few isolated people, after all a very small number in the modern era, people who, for one reason or another, never crossed the threshold of the previous community and who, nevertheless, found themselves grappling with the irrepressible need to give substance to such an organisation of fantasies that inhabited them.”

Though the book won the Nadar Prize in 1963, George Raine notes that though Ehrmann was "one of the first persons to publicize M. Isidore's art [...] not many of the books were printed, and interest or knowledge of this art and works like it remained largely in the province of the French artistic community" before other, English-language publications spread knowledge of these 'naïve' architects and builders internationally.

In 1960, Ehrmann and Jean-Pierre Sudre undertook a major project for the Esthétique industrielle group at the request of EDF. During this time he started a series of photographs of mummified bodies in the catacombs of Palermo for an unpublished book, Œdipe Sphinx (Oedipus the Sphinx), with the poet Ghérasim Luca, exhibited in 1981 at Galerie Agathe Gaillard, Paris, about which, in an interview with Hervé Guibert, he explained:

I wanted to tell a story about life, I sensed that death could very well advocate for life. Initially, while visiting the catacombs of Palermo, the subject intrigued me. I am not reporting, I am acting towards something.

In 1962, he made an extensive trip to Lapland, and in 1968, photographed in Nepal. Faire un Pas, published in 1993 by Hazan, contained photographs from these travels to Nepal, India, and Afghanistan

After the Breton's death in 1966, his wife asked Ehrmann to compile a photographic inventory of the studio at 42 rue Fontaine, images not published until thirty years later in 1997, with text by Julien Gracq.

== Reception ==
Jacques Dumons, art director of Réalités, described Ehrmann as "capable of putting any abstract theme into thoughtful and poetic images."

Frank Horvat remembered Ehrmann as "dangling a cigarette from his lips, telling improbable stories. And when he encounters skepticism in his interlocutor's eyes, he doesn't stop; on the contrary, he adds more, at the risk of exhausting them."

André Breton in 1962 remembered:

When I only knew Gilles Ehrmann by sight—it was on one of the less frequented beaches of Ouessant—how many times did I notice his way of acting, wandering without losing his extreme vigilance to suddenly seize, on the fly, with a click, what could only be a happy play of light across the pebbles!

Frequently Ehrmann is referred to as not widely known, or as did Miriam Rosen in Artforum in which she characterises him as "certainly not an unknown photographer", but "low profile", and of his style remarks that Faire un pas ("Take a step", of 1968) "record[s] groups of villagers in Northern India, Afghanistan, and Nepal with the fixity of Italian Renaissance frescoes."

In her review in Le Monde, Valérie Cadet praised his work for "its hallmark of poetry and wandering," and what she saw as major influences, the portraitist August Sander, the modern American photographer Paul Strand, and the reporter Robert Capa.

Historian Jean-Claude Lemagny identifies as his strength Ehrmann's rejection of "anything that displaces, anything that clings or adds to the simple and authentic presence of things and people," while Henri-Claude Cousseau credits him with a "discreet intransigence".

== Legacy ==
In his last years, Ehrmann made a maquette including a number of his prints from differfent series such as: Faire un pas (1962), Les inspirés et leurs demeures (1962), OEdipe-Sphinx (1960–1976) and in 2019, Gilles' daughter Sabine Ehrmann gave it among his archives to the Médiathèque du patrimoine et de la photographie (Media Library of Heritage and Photography). The Médiathèque produced a facsimile, with the series' original layout and chronological sequence, to whch Matthieu Rivallin, assistant to the head of the department of photography, added a biography, and a text by the photographer's daughter.

A 16mm colour film on the photographer, Gilles Ehrmann et la photographie (26 minutes) by Ehrmann's assistant Patrick Van Antwerpen was produced 1993, but remained unfinished due to the subject's death, and a monograph by Jean-Luc Mercié appeared in 1998.

Ehrmann himself remarked on his medium that:

In photography, there is a search for material that can lead to a dead end: a beautiful photo. But light transcends material. Colour easily produces a worldly hyperrealism, which is why it must be bleached to achieve a heightened luminosity.

== Selected solo exhibitions ==
- 1951: Provence Noire, Tourrettes-sur-Loup.
- 1960: Inspired and Their Homes, Les Deux Îles Gallery, Paris.
- 1965, 19 June—1 September: Retrospective, designed by Claude Parent and with a catalogue designed by Jacques Dumons. Théâtre-Maison de la Culture, Caen
- 1970: Maison de la Culture, Suresnes, France (projection)
- 1971: Maison de la Culture, Rennes, France (projection; with Gherasim Luca)
- 1971: Galerie Albertus Magnus, Paris (projection; with Gherasim Luca)
- 1974 Festival de Fylkingen, Stockholm (projection; with Gherasim Luca)
- 1974: Maison de la Culture, Rennes, France (projection; with Gherasim Luca)
- 1975/6 12 December—21 February 21: Photographs of Gilles Ehrmann, Bibliothèque nationale, Paris
- 1975: Maison de la Culture, Firminy, France (projection; with Gherasim Luca)
- 1975: Musée d'Art Moderne de la Ville, Paris (projection; with Gherasim Luca)
- 1975: Comédie, Caen, France (projection; with Gherasim Luca)
- 1976, 24 April—7 June 7. Photographs of Gilles Ehrmann, Maison de la culture, Bourges
- 1976, 29 August—26 September: Photographs of Gilles Ehrmann, Norrköpings Museum, Norrköping, Sweden
- 1976: Franska Institutet, Stockholm
- 1977 Centre Culturel Les Gemeaux, Sceaux, France
- 1977 Maison de la Culture, Rennes, France
- 1978: Musée d'Art Moderne de la Ville, Paris
- 1979: Maison des Arts et de la Culture, Creteil, France
- 1980: Galerie Agathe Gaillard, Paris
- 1981: Oedipe Sphinx, Galerie Agathe Gaillard, Paris
- 1981 Maison des Junes et de la Culture, La Souterraine, France
- 1981: Musée des Sables d'Olonne, France
- 1981: Palais de Chaillot, Paris
- 1981: Maison de la Culture, Amiens, France
- 1981: Musée de Chartres, France
- 1982, 5 August—30 September: Gilles Ehrmann: Photographs, Sainte-Croix Abbey Museum, Les Sables-d'Olonne
- 1982: Oedipe Sphinx, Chaillot, Gémiers, Paris
- 1982: Centre St. Martial, Angoulême, France
- 1983 Hotel d'Escoville, Caen, France
- 1983: Musée des Beaux Arts, Caen, France (projection; with Gherasim Luca)
- 1983: Centre Georges Pompidou, Paris (projection; with Gherasim Luca)
- 1985: Architecture contemporaine en Bretagne, travelled to Brest, Rennes and Nantes, France
- 1986: Galerie Agathe Gaillard, Paris
- 1986: Galerie de la Salle, Saint Paul de Vence, France
- 1993, 6 July—20 August. Gilles Ehrmann: retrospective, Musée Réattu, Arles (as part of the Rencontres de la photographie d'Arles)
- 1993/4, 14 December—6 February, Gilles Ehrmann: retrospective, Centre photographique d'Île-de-France
- 1998 July 3 - September 30, 1998: Gilles Ehrmann, curator Michel Roudie, Abbaye aux Dames, Saintes
- 1998/9, 7 October—16 March 16, 1999. Galerie du Château d'eau, Toulouse

== Selected group exhibitions ==
- 1964: World Exhibition of Photography: What Is Man?, Pressehaus Stern, Hamburg (and world tour)
- 1966: Exploration du Futur, Salines Royales, Arc et Seans, France
- 1967, 26 November-2 January 1968: Photography in the Fine Arts Exhibition V curated by Ivan Dmitri. De Young Museum, San Francisco
- 1968, 6 June–7 July: Photography in the Fine Arts Exhibition V with Richard Avedon, Wynn Bullock, Marie Cosindas, Imogen Cunningham, Alfred Eisenstadt, Andreas Feininger, Art Kane, André Kertesz, Barbara Morgan, Arnold Newman, Gordon Parks, Anthony Armstrong-Jones, and Jerry N. Uelsmann, curated by Ivan Dmitri. Virginia Museum of Fine Arts
- 1973: 3rd World Exhibition of Photography, Pressehaus Stern, Hamburg (and world tour)
- 1979: La Famille des Portraits, Musée des Arts Décoratifs, Paris
- 1980: Dix Photographes pour le Patrimoine, Centre Georges Pompidou, Paris
- 1981: French Photography 1945-1980: A Selection, Zabriskie Gallery, New York
- 1981: Jacques Prévert et ses Amis Photographes, Centre National de la Photographie, Lyon, France (travelled to the Musée d'Art Moderne de la Ville, Paris)
- 1982: Les Prévert de Prévert, Bibliothèque Nationale, Paris
- 1984: Six Photographes chez Le Corbusier, Centre Georges Pompidou, Paris
- 1985: Les Stations Thermales, École des Beaux Arts, Paris
- 2005: Palais du Tau, Reims (group exhibition)
- 2009: Galerie Verdeau, Paris (group exhibition)
- 2013, 11 April—9 May: Agathe Gaillard: Mémoires d'une Galerie, Paris (group exhibition)
- 2022, 7 October—15 January 2023: 150 photographies de la collection Bachelot, Villa Medici, Rome (group exhibition)

== Collections ==
- Médiathèque du patrimoine et de la photographie, 11 rue du Séminaire de Conflans 94 220 Charenton-le-Pont
- Collection Frac Bretagne
- Centre Pompidou
- The Israel Museum, Jerusalem
- Collection Florence and Damien Bachelot
- Collection Agnès B. La Fab. Galerie du Jour, Place Jean-Michel Basquiat, 75013 Paris
- Bibliothèque Nationale, Paris; Musée d'Art Moderne de la Ville, Paris
- Fonds National d'Art Contemporain, Paris
- Musée des Sables d'Olonne, France
- Musée de Toulon, France
- Photothèque de Pret, Arles, France
- Nörrköpings Museum, Sweden

== Publications ==
- Provence noire, texts by André Verdet, original cover Picasso, Paris, Cercle d'art, 1955, 143 p.
- De Saint-Paul-de-Vence, text by André Verdet, Geneva, Pierre Cailler, 1956; 64 photographs by Gilles Ehrmann and a photomontage by Jacques Prévert.
- Ghérasim Luca, Crier taire sourire fou, Paris, 1961; artist's book: 37 photographs of G. Luca's cubomania by Gilles Ehrmann, mounted on Rives BFK paper, text entirely calligraphed by Pierre Boutillier; edition: 2 copies.
- Ehrmann, Gilles (1962). Les inspirés et leurs demeures. Paris: Le Temps. OCLC 1059996.
- Ehrmann, Gilles (1993). Faire un pas. Fondation électricité de France. Paris: Hazan. ISBN 978-2-85025-327-0. Journal of a trip taken in 1968 to India, Afghanistan, and Nepal.
- Gracq, Julien; Ehrmann, Gilles; Brenton, André, eds. (2003). 42 rue Fontaine - l'atelier d'André Breton. Paris: Biro. ISBN 978-2-87660-374-5.
- Doisneau, Robert; Ehrmann, Gilles; Soubeyran, Charles, eds. (2004). Les révoltés du Merveilleux. Cognac: Le temps qu'il Fait. ISBN 978-2-86853-417-0.
