= Jean-Philippe Charbonnier =

French Humanist photographer and photojournalist (1921–2004)

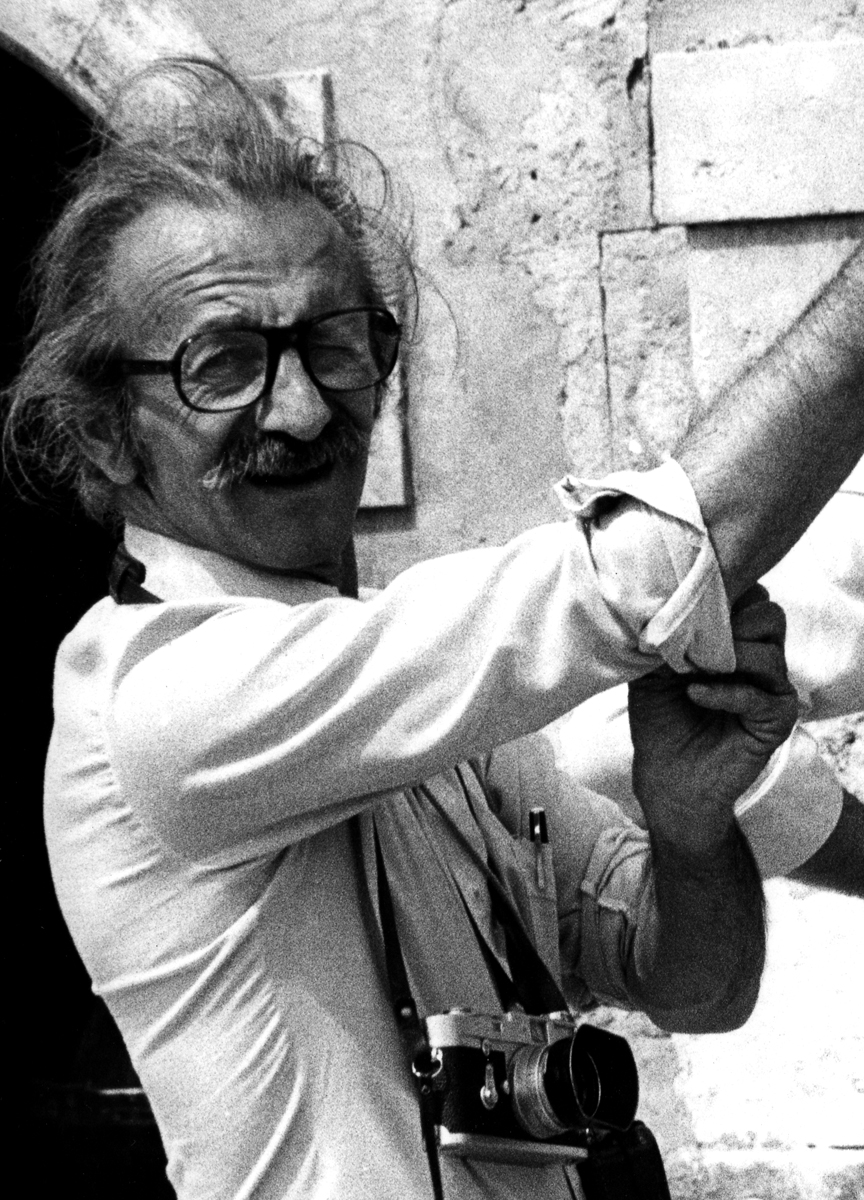
- Charbonnier in 1975
- Born: 28 August 1921; Paris, France
- Died: 28 May 2004 (aged 82); Grasse, France
- Education: apprenticeship to Sam Lévin, Jean Manevy
- Known for: Photojournalism
- Notable work: photojournalism for Réalités
- Movement: Humanist photography
- Spouses: Gisèle Gonfreville (m. 1951; div. 1965); [Agathe Gaillard (m. 1968; div. 1982); Christine Vaissié (m. 1983)
- Children: 3
- Parents: Annette Vaillant; Pierre Charbonnier
- Awards: Vermeil Medal for Photography

Jean-Philippe Charbonnier (28 August 1921 – 28 May 2004) was a French photographer whose works typify the humanist impulse in that medium in his homeland of the period after World War II.

== Early life ==
Jean-Philippe Charbonnier was born in Paris into a family of artists and intellectuals. His mother, Annette Vaillant was a writer and daughter of Alfred Natanson a.k.a. Alfred Athis, a founder of the Revue Blanche, and actress Martha Mellot; his father, Pierre Charbonnier, was a painter, and as a boy, Jean-Philippe met Max Ernst, Pierre Bonnard and the photographer Jacques-Henri Lartigue. His parents separated and he was brought up by his stepfather, Gustave Moutet. At the Lycée Condorcet in Paris he studied philosophy, English and German, but at 18, Jean-Philippe received a camera from his father who encouraged him to become a photographer, and he discontinued his studies to work in the movie star portrait studio of Sam Lévin ('discoverer' of Brigitte Bardot). He left his hometown to follow Lévin to Lyon, Marseille and Toulon, then went into exile for two years in neutral Switzerland early in the Second World War, where he met with Jean Manevy who instructed him in the art of typography and journalism.

== Photojournalism ==
On return to France in 1944, Charbonnier worked for Théodore (Théo) Blanc (1891–1985) and Antoine (Tony) Demilly (1892–1964) in their darkrooms in Lyon, where he learnt how to print. At the end of the war he photographed, in the village of Vienne, near Grenoble, the execution of a Nazi collaborator in front of a crowd of five thousand people. Popular Photography notes that;

proof of [Charbonnier's] skill early in his career is shown by his coverage of a public execution during the World War II period. He shot the entire story in only 30 frames—possibly because film was scarce then. The drama had a beginning (marching in of the firing squad), a middle (complete with coup de grace), and an end (carting away the corpse in a coffin)—all this before a large crowd of French citizens. Charbonnier's work bears the trademark of all great photojournalists- superb technique matched with an observant eye. His early work involved indoor flash with extensions, a style it was then obligatory to master. Versatile on location, he covered assignments from the Folies Bergère to the desert and Arctic."

In the late 40s, he became the chief typesetter for Liberation, and later France Dimanche. He also wrote for Point de Vue, where for the first time his photographs were published, in 1949, by editor Albert Plecy (1914-1977).

In 1950, he was appointed reporter for the magazine Réalités, specializing in stories of French everyday life, but also travelling the world for the magazine. In 1951 he was photographing the Tuaregs in North Africa; in 1954, shoeshine boys in Brazil; as early as 1955 he visited China and then Outer Mongolia, where he was the first Western photographer given a licence to work; then in Moscow during the Cold War; as well as Kuwait, where he made one of his best remembered pictures, of a veiled Kuwaiti woman carrying a sewing machine on her head; the former French Equatorial Africa, where he photographed Albert Schweitzer (and his pelican) in Gabon; and Alaska.

Charbonnier's humanist images are 'straight', or realist, a quality in his work was recognised with inclusion amongst Edith Gérin, Janine Niépce and Sabine Weiss, Marcel Bovis, René-Jacques, Jean Dieuzaide, Jean Marquis, Leon Herschtritt, Jean-Louis Swiners, Eric Schwab, and André Papillon in the 1992 monograph La photographie humaniste: 1930-1960 : histoire d'un mouvement en France and the exhibition Humanist photography, 1945-1968 at the National Library of France from 31 October 2006 to 28 January 2007. Humanist photography, as it became known in France, though never a formal group or movement, was a post-war movement that helped build a French national identity and iconography, both its picturesque places and its social clichés, but it also denounced the harsh realities of the period; the move to the cities and growth of the urban working class, poverty, lack of housing and the fear of the Cold War. This was the style of the Rapho photo agency owned and run by Raymond Grosset (who took it over from founder Charles Rado after the war), of which Charbonnier became a member along with others of the younger generation of photojournalist, including Jean Dieuzaide, Sabine Weiss and Janine Niepce. Like his colleagues, Charbonnier identified closely with the classe populaire and focused on the worker, as exemplified by his image Miner being washed by his wife, 1954. One of his stories for Réalités, published January 1955, in which he employed an objective point of view exposed conditions in a mental hospital that are a valuable document today in gauging the progress of psychiatric treatment (a number of the most powerful images were not published due to the sensitivities of the 1950s), while in 1966 another of his stories, Hélène et Jean, six heures de voyage à travers l'extase et l'angoisse, follows the consequences of drug addiction and overdose. The book of his photographs from assignments for Réalités, with text by writer and surrealist poet Philippe Soupault. Les Chemins de la vie, was published by Les éditions du Cap in 1957.

Charbonnier decided to leave Réalités in 1974 to concentrate on his Paris neighborhood of Notre-Dame de Paris and produced extended essays on that precinct.

== Commercial photography ==
In the 1960s, with television beginning to replace the glossy magazines, Charbonnier turned increasingly to commercial photography, working for large companies such as Carrefour, Royal Air Maroc and Renault, freelancing for the Ministry of Labour and the World Health Organisation and also in the fashion industry, photographing Pierre Cardin, his fashions and models, from 1958.

He taught photography in Paris at the Ecole Supérieure des Arts Graphiques and also in England.

== Recognition and legacy ==
Today Charbonnier's photographs are historical documents showing us the transformation of French society between 1945 and 2004.

Charbonnier was active in his promotion of the profession, contributed vigorously to sessions at Les 30 x 40, the Club Photographique de Paris, and in 1970, at the invitation of writer Michel Tournier, he participated in the first Rencontres d'Arles as a guest of honor, and was included in first public evening meeting of three important 'Photographers of the Moment', with Brihat Denis and Jean-Pierre Sudre. Many photographers from all over France came to this event.

== Personal life ==
Jean-Philippe Charbonnier married Gisèle Gonfreville, with whom he had two daughters, divorcing her to marry Agathe Gaillard, with whom, in 1975, he opened a photography gallery in Paris, the Agathe Gaillard Gallery, which dealt in Charbonnier's popular Paris photos. Today, the gallery still exists and shows classic mid-century French photography. He and Agathe had a daughter, Eglantine. In 1996 he married Christine Vaissié, graphic designer and art director, who assisted in the preparation of the retrospective Charbonnier exhibition at the Modern Art Museum of the City of Paris in 1983. She remained with him until the end of his life.

In 1983, he was awarded the Vermeil Medal for Photography by the city of Paris.

Charbonnier died, of a disease contracted during his travels, in Grasse on 28 May 2004, the same year as Henri Cartier-Bresson, whom he regarded as '...a formidable "statue"...THE Living National Treasure at its best...'

"It took me 30 years and a lot of pain to discover the truth of what Henri Cartier-Bresson always said. One should only use one camera with one lens that coincides with your angle of vision, with the same film at its normal speed. The rest is just gimmick and hardware."

== Exhibitions ==
=== Solo ===
- 1972: Maison de la Culture, Le Havre
- 1972: Photographers' Gallery, London
- 1974: Centre Culturel, Bruxelles
- 1974: J.-P. Charbonnier, Marc Riboud, Reporters-Photographers, Institut Francais, Stockholm
- 1976: Portraits et Situations, Centre Culturel, Berlin
- 1976: I think we met before, Galerie Agathe Gaillard, Paris
- 1976: I think we met before, Galerie Nagel, Berlin
- 1978: 50 Photographies nouvelles 1975-78, Galerie Agathe Gaillard, Paris
- 1978: 50 Photographies nouvelles 1975-78, Galerie Nagel, Berlin
- 1980: Galerie Penning, Endhoven, Netherlands
- 1983: Retrospective 1944-1982 (300 photos), Musee d'Art Moderne, Paris

=== Group ===
- 1979: Fleeting Gestures: Dance Photographs, New York, London, Venezia

=== Posthumous ===
- 2014/15: Jean-Philippe Charbonnier, l'Oeil de Paris. Crédit Municipal de Paris

== Publications ==
- Charbonnier, Jean-Philippe; Soupault, Philippe (1957). Chemins De La Vie. Monte-Carlo: Editions du cap. OCLC 35712910.
- Gosset, Pierre; Pierre-Gosset, Renée; Charbonnier, Jean-Philippe (1956). Terrifiante Asie. Tome II., Chine rouge : an VII (in French). Paris: René Julliard. OCLC 491023779.
- Charbonnier, Jean Philippe (1961). Un photographe vous parle (in French). Paris: B. Grasset. OCLC 3265389.
- Charbonnier, Jean-Philippe (1966). Album de l'Organisation mondiale de la santé (in French). Genève. OCLC 490522867.
- Gayraud, Marcel; Deltheil, Michel; Charbonnier, Jean-Philippe (1969). Maroc : terre aux ailes de sable (Morocco : a land with wings of sand). Translated by Hall, Lewis. Morocco: Royal Air Maroc. OCLC 937233402.
- Charbonnier, Jean-Philippe; Deltheil, Michel (1970). Fes: mosaique de lumière (in French). Royal Air Maroc. OCLC 28875559.
- Charbonnier, Jean-Philippe; Deltheil, Michel (1971). Tan-tan au bout du vrai voyage. Paris: Draeger. OCLC 934476378.
- Charbonnier, Jean-Philippe; Borghesan, Giuliano; Sefrioui, Ahmed; Hughes, Stephen; Gayraud, Marcel (1972). Maroc vallees heureuses du haut atlas (service publicité royal air Maroc ed.). Casablanca: Royal air Maroc, [. OCLC 1099934112.
- Charbonnier, Jean-Philippe; Tournier, Michel; Musée des beaux-arts André Malraux (1972). 107 photographies en noir et blanc 1945-1971 : ... catalogue ... à l' occasion de l'exposition organisée par la Maison de la culture du Hâvre au mois de mai 1972. Paris: Éditions Agathe Gaillard. OCLC 170885745.
- Charbonnier, Jean-Philippe (1974). Jean Philippe Charbonnier, Marc Riboud, reporters-photographes. Franska Institutet i samarbete med Fotografiska Museet [30 nov.-28 dec. 1974. Stockholm] (in French). Stockholm: Fotografiska Museet. OCLC 25928220.
- Engel, François; Charbonnier, Jean-Philippe (1976). Beautés de la France. 31, Nîmes et le pont du Gard (in French). Paris: Larousse. OCLC 461788192.
- Charbonnier, Jean-Philippe; Musée d'art moderne de la ville de Paris (1983). 300 photographs 1944-1982 (Catalogue of an exhibition held 23 March - 28 August 1983 ed.). Paris: Musée d'Art Moderne de la Ville de Paris. ISBN 9782904732003. OCLC 1193519441.
- Charbonnier, Jean-Philippe (1992). Chamonix : 40 ans dans la vallée (in French). Grenoble: Glénat. ISBN 9782723414982. OCLC 32169754.
- Mousseron, Jules; Charbonnier, Jean-Philippe; Doisneau, Robert; Roni, Willy (1993). Cavanna, François (ed.). Les enfants de Germinal (in French). Paris: Hoëbeke. ISBN 9782905292599. OCLC 415430442.
- Doisneau, Robert; Charbonnier, Jean-Philippe; Frasnay, Daniel (1995). Années 50 = The fifties (in French). Paris: Hazan. ISBN 9782850254062. OCLC 40169347.
