= Connaissance des Arts =

French art magazine

Connaissance des arts is a monthly French art magazine devoted to the arts and their current events, published since March 1952 by the French Society for the Promotion of Art. Its headquarters are on the 10 Boulevard de Grenelle, 75015 Paris.

In 2019-2020, the total of its distribution was around 45000 copies.

== History ==
The magazine Connaissance des arts was founded by Humbert Frèrejean and Didier-W Rémon within the Réalités group with which it shares the building at 13, rue Saint-Georges in Paris.

The first number was published in 1952 under the title Connoisseur, the monthly guide for art lovers by the Hachette group, but due to the proximity of the name to the American magazine Connoisseur, it will appear in the second issue under the title Connaissance des arts.

The magazine adopts, under the direction of Francis Spar, a rather broad editorial line covering the arts since antiquity, modern art, decoration and the description of objects of art at all times. It was bought in 1975 by the Jodidio family and under the direction of Philip Jodidio, is also oriented towards architecture, museology, large collections. In 1989 the first special issue appeared. In the 1990s, the magazine increasingly followed contemporary art.

In April 2000, Connaissance des arts was acquired by the luxury group LVMH (through the Les Échos-Le Parisien group) and, in 2002, Guy Boyer replaced Philip Jodidio.

In 2019, Connaissance des Arts became a 48% shareholder of the company Agence d'Evénements Culturels which organizes the Paris-based arts fairs Fine Arts Paris and Salon du dessin, the magazine's first foray into events. In 2021, LVMH bought the arts books editing company Citadelles & Mazenod and merged it in Connaissance des Arts.
