= Angelika Platen =

German photographer (born 1942)

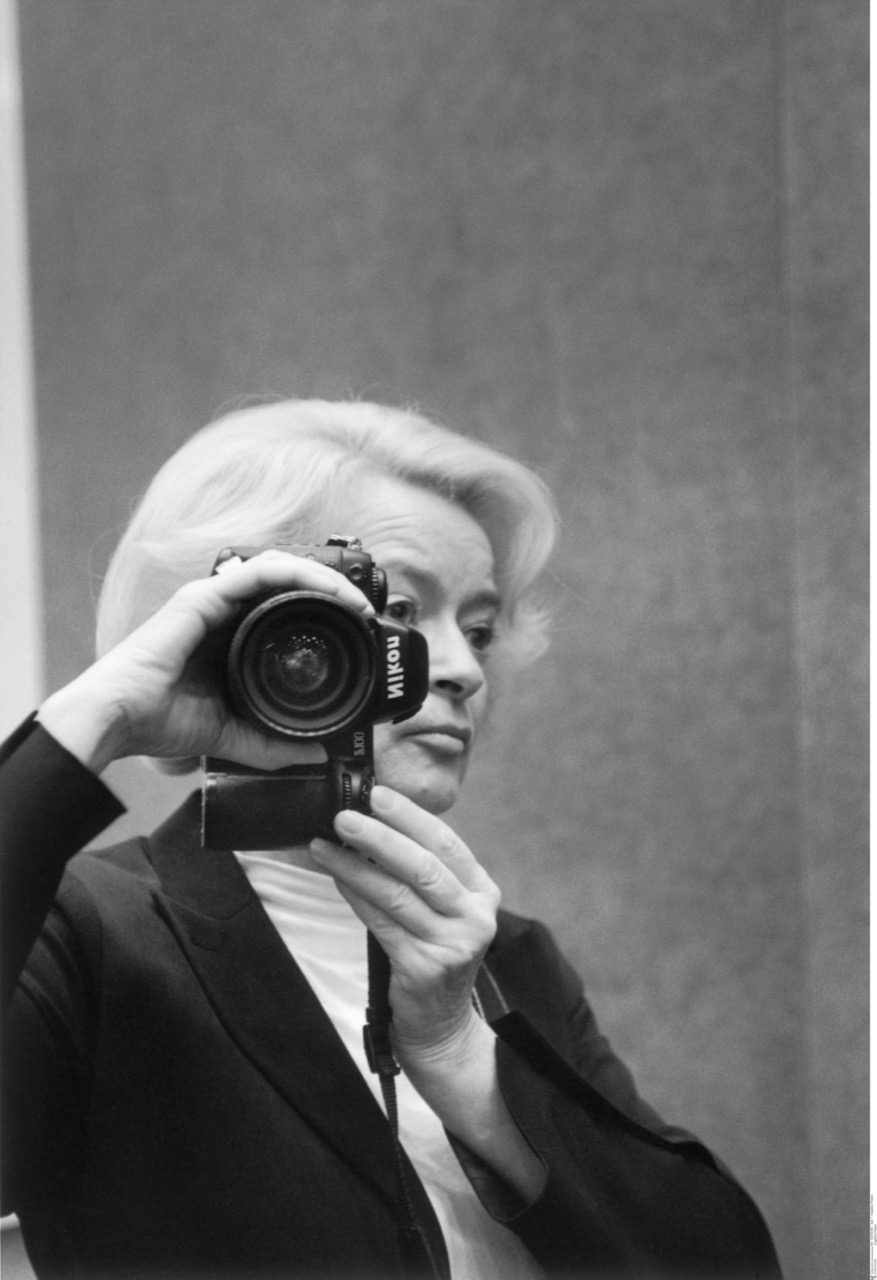
- Born: 19 February 1942; Heidelberg
- Known for: Photography
- Website: angelikaplaten.com

Angelika Platen (born 19 February 1942 in Heidelberg) is a German photographer known internationally for her portraits of artists.

== Life and work ==
Angelika Platen studied art history, Romance studies and Oriental studies at the Free University of Berlin. followed by photography at the University of Fine Arts of Hamburg.

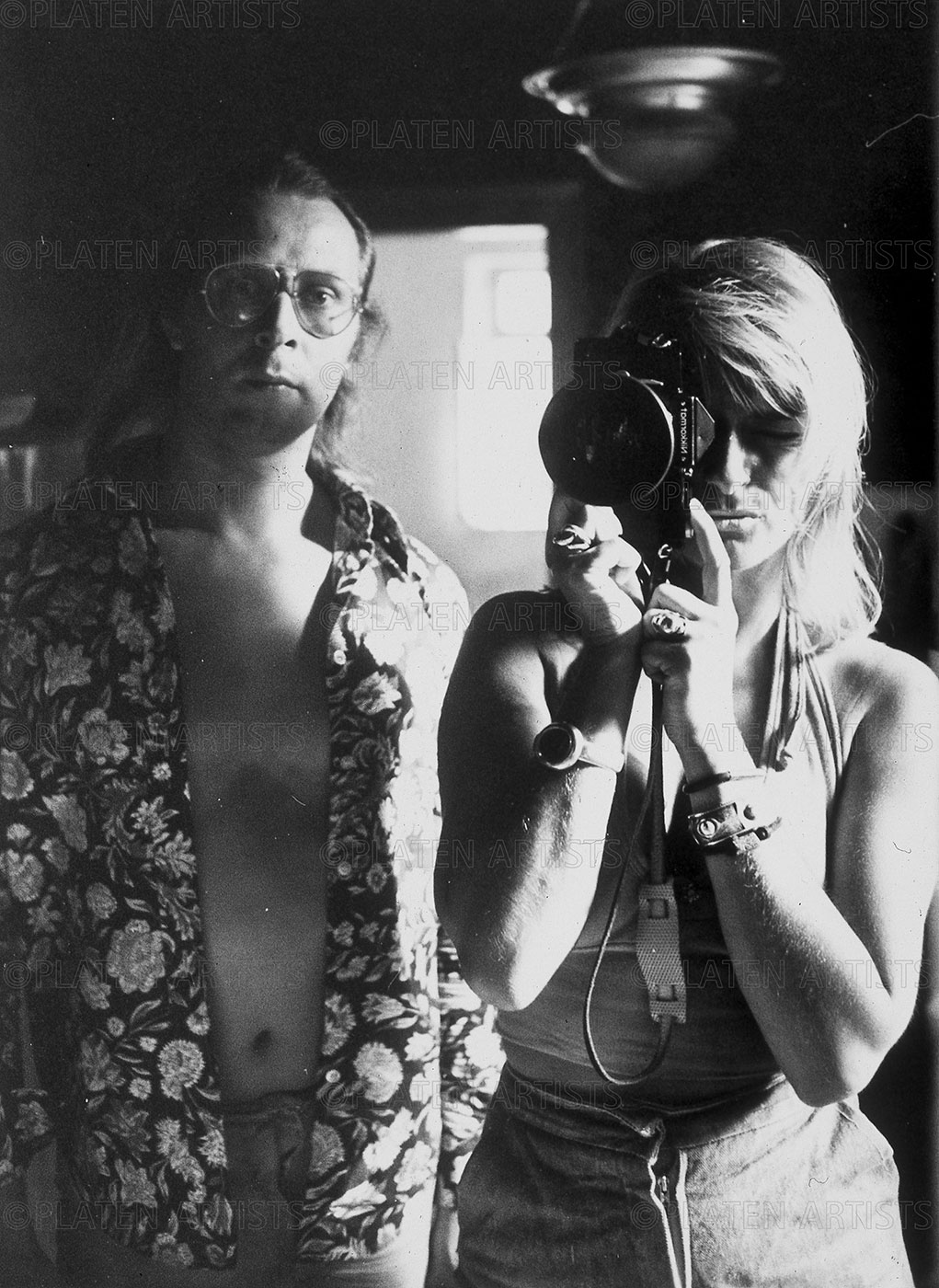
© Angelika Platen, Sigmar Polke and Angelika Platen, Zwei im Spiegel, Willich 1972

In 1968 she began working as a photographer and photojournalist. In 1969 she exhibited her photographs for the first time at the gallery Die Insel under the title Künstler sind auch nur Menschen. From 1970 to 1972 she worked as a journalist for the business section "Kunst als Ware" of the weekly newspaper Die Zeit. Her first marriage was to essayist, reporter and writer Karl Günter Simon, with whom she had two daughters.

From 1972 to 1975 she ran the Gunter Sachs Gallery on Milchstrasse in Hamburg. During this period she produced hundreds of photographic portraits of young artists at the beginning of their careers, some of whom are now world-famous. Her pieces show the painters, sculptors, conceptual and object artists in their respective artistic contexts: she photographs them both in their characteristic ambience and in unusual settings.

At the end of the 1970s the photographer moved to Paris, where she worked as head of the public relations department in an IT company. She married again and had a third daughter.

In 1997, she resumed her photographic studies, with Phase II of her photographic activity commencing without a break in style. Her partner of many years, the cultural journalist and publicist Günter Engelhard, editor of her books and author of many texts about her, created poetic picture titles for her photographs.

Angelika Platen has photographed a considerable amount of contemporary artists, including in Phase I, Georg Baselitz, Joseph Beuys, Christo, Hanne Darboven, Walter de Maria, Dan Graham, Blinky Palermo, Sigmar Polke, Gerhard Richter, James Rosenquist, Günther Uecker and Andy Warhol. In Phase II, she photographed Marina Abramović, John Armleder, Christian Boltanski, Jeff Koons, Neo Rauch, Julian Rosefeldt and Thomas Struth, among others. She later photographed for a second time some of the earlier newcomers she had first portrayed in the 1960s and 1970s. These portraits take another look at the established artists who had meanwhile come of age.

On the occasion of the 1998 exhibition Angelika Platen - Photo Works, the Museum für Moderne Kunst in Frankfurt am Main acquired a collection of the photographs taken between 1968 and 1974. Further exhibitions at well-known institutions were to follow, including the Martin-Gropius-Bau, the Haus am Lützowplatz, Willy-Brand-Haus and the Institut-Francais in Berlin. Platen’s portraits have been exhibited at the Goethe Institutes in Washington and Paris. At the Städtische Galerie Delmenhorst, her portraits were put in dialogue with documents by the collector Egidio Marzona. The conceptual photographs of the 1960s and 1970s were shown in the driving exhibition of the collector Axel Haubrok.

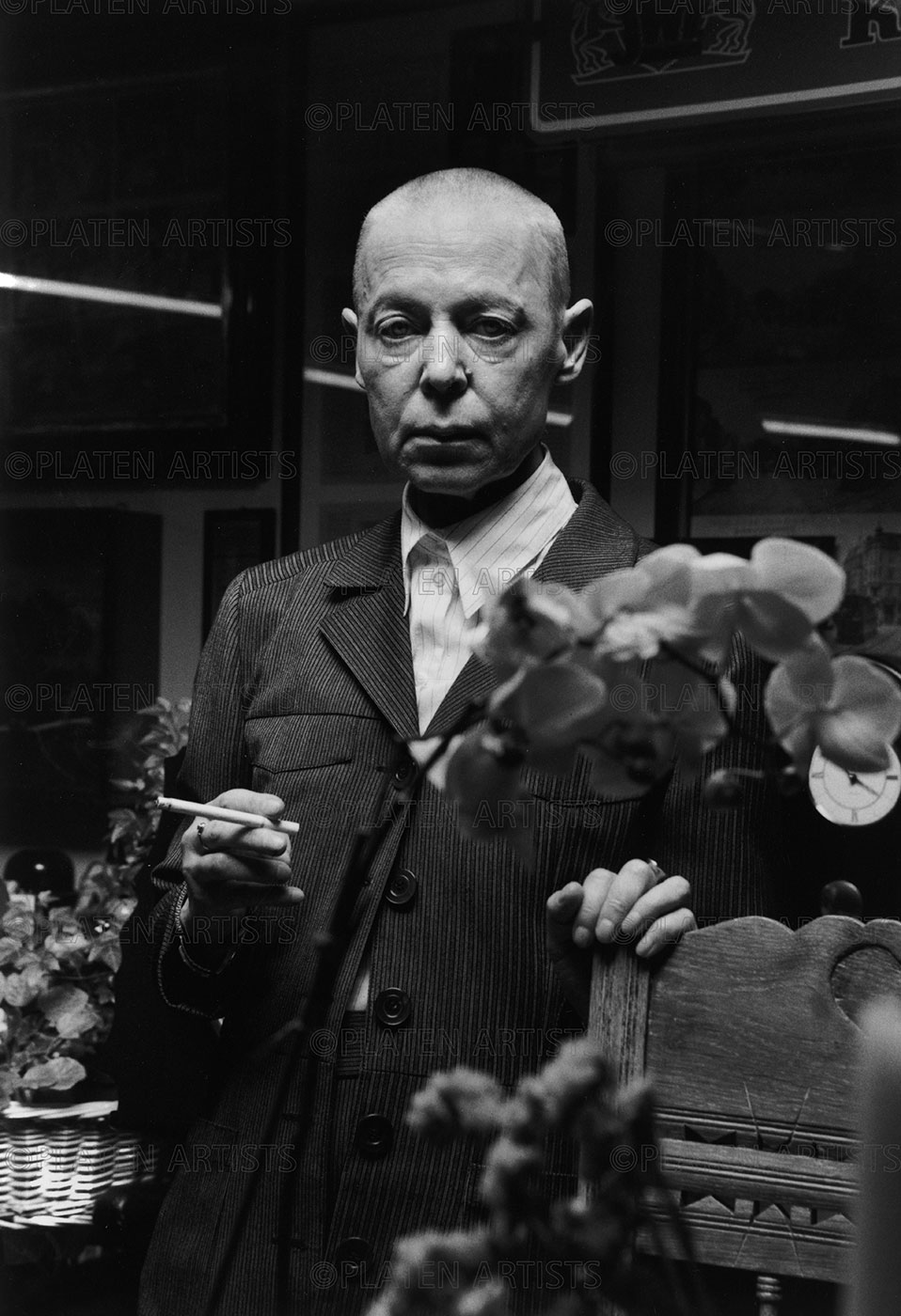
© Angelika Platen, Hanne Darboven, Flowering Time, Hamburg 2002

In addition to her work as a photographer, Platen collects portraits of artists by other photographers. Her collection begins "on the threshold of the turn of the 20th century" with photographs by Berenice Abbot (Eugène Atget), Man Ray (Pablo Picasso)[1] all the way to Robert Mapplethorpe's and Duane Michal's portraits of Andy Warhol. In 2018, she presented 180 photographs from her collection of over 700 artist portraits, including Robert Capa, Henri Cartier-Bresson, Robert Doisneau and Germaine Krull, to the public for the first time in the exhibition Künstler Komplex (Artist Complex) at the Museum für Fotografie (Berlin).

Angelika Platen is "an outstanding artist portraitist", wrote Andreas Kilb in the FAZ in 2018: Hanne Darboven's 2002 photograph is "one of the masterpieces of the genre because it turns the celebrity into a human view". The photo, titled Verblühende Zeit, shows the sixty-year-old artist smoking next to flowering orchids. "This photograph is significant because it continues a tradition in Western art history that began in the Renaissance, and at the same time transforms it." Ludger Derenthal and Joachim Brand write of Platen: "As an artist portraitist, she has shaped the public perception of artists for many years, and her collection of portraits can be seen as a self-assurance of the foundations of her own work."

© Angelika Platen, Miriam Vlaming, Winged Painter, Berlin 2017

Platen's work is well documented in various illustrated books and has been shown at numerous exhibitions.

== Solo exhibitions in museums and institutions ==
- 1998: Museum of Modern Art, Frankfurt am Main, photographic works
- 2001: Martin-Gropius-Bau, Berlin, Platen Artists; Museum für Kunst und Gewerbe, Hamburg, artist photographs
- 2002: Hallescher Kunstverein, Halle
- 2002: Goethe Institute, Paris
- 2003: Fries Museum, Leeuwarden, Platen Artists
- 2003: Goethe-Institut, Washington D.C.
- 2004: Galleria d'Arte Moderna, Bologna
- 2005: Haus am Lützowplatz, Berlin, Platen Artists
- 2007: Gallery of the Capital, Prague
- 2008: National Museums in Berlin, Art Library (together with Hans Namuth, Lothar Wolleh, and Andrea Stappert), Immortal! The Photo of the Artist
- 2011: Umweltakzente, Monschau, photographer of the artists Angelika Platen
- 2013: Muzeul Național de Artă Contemporană, Bucharest, Please, no photos
- 2015: Städtische Galerie Delmenhorst, Delmenhorst, Spurenlese
- 2017: Willy-Brandt-Haus Berlin, Künstlern auf der Spur. Portraits 1968-2008; Galerie Michael Schultz, Berlin, dialog.digital.analog.
- 2018: Institut français, Berlin, FEMMES ARTISTES.
- 2022: Fahrbereitschaft, Berlin, Angelika Platen: Sequences. Conceptual Photography

== Solo exhibitions in galleries ==
- 1998: Gallery Renate Schröder, Cologne Platen Artists
- 1999: Gallery Artiscope, Brussels
- 2005: Gallery Hohenthal and Bergen, Berlin, Sigmar Polke - In the middle of the air
- 2006: Gallery Jean Brolly, Paris, no photos please
- 2006: Gallery Bernd Slutzky Polke, Richter, Palermo, photographic works 1971-1972
- 2007: Gallery Haas AG, Zurich, Platen Artists
- 2017: Galerie Michael Schultz, Berlin, dialog.digital.analog
- 2018: Gallery Michael Schultz, Berlin, Indescribably female
- 2019: VON&VON Gallery, Nuremberg, Meet your Artist. Artist Portraits
- 2022: Gallery Michael Haas, Berlin, Dialogue
- 2022: VON&VON Gallery, Nuremberg, My Women

== Works in public collections ==
Berlinische Galerie; DZ Bank Kunstsammlung, Frankfurt; Fries Museum, Leeuwarden, Netherlands; Kunsthalle Hamburg; Hessisches Landesmuseum; Museum für Kunst und Gewerbe, Hamburg; mumok - Museum moderner Kunst, Stiftung Ludwig Wien; Museum für Moderne Kunst, Frankfurt am Main; Museum Kunstpalast, AFORK, Düsseldorf; Museum Schloss Moyland, Kleve; Sammlung Erika Hoffmann, Berlin; Sammlung Fotografie Kunstbibliothek, Staatliche Museen, Berlin; Sammlung Lothar Schirmer, Munich; Stiftung Kunstsammlung Nordrhein-Westfalen, Düsseldorf.

== Literature (selection) ==
- Angelika Platen, Platen artists. Photography, with texts by Klaus Honnef, Günter Engelhard, Axel Hecht and others, Edition Stemmle: Kilchberg 1998, ISBN 978-3-908161-55-4.
- Angelika Platen, Sigmar Polke - Mitten in der Luft, with a text by Günter Engelhard, Klein, Bad Münstereifel 2003.
- Immortal! The Artist's Photograph, Staatliche Museen zu Berlin, Berlin 2008, ISBN 978-3-88609-656-5.
- Günter Engelhard (ed.), Angelika Platen Künstler|Artists, with texts by Christina Weiss, Thomas Hettche and Heinz Peter Schwerfel, Hatje Cantz: Ostfildern 2010, ISBN 978-3-7757-2653-5.
- Marek Keller, Portrait Photos of Angelika Platen: Abtauchen, Auftauchen, Klick,, Spiegel Online, 14 September 2010.
- Christiane Meixner, Besuch mich doch mal im Studio, Der Tagesspiegel, 21 November 2010.
- Spurenlese - Artists' portraits photographed by Angelika Platen. Dokumente aus dem Archiv Marzona, Städtische Galerie Delmenhorst, Delmenhorst 2015, ISBN 978-3-944683-13 -
- Jürgen Schilling (text), dialog.digital.analog, exhibition catalogue, Galerie Michael Schulz, Berlin 2017, ISBN 978-3-946879-00-8.
- Artist Complex. Photographic Portraits from Baselitz to Warhol. Sammlung Platen, exhibition catalogue, for the Kunstbibliothek Staatliche Museen zu Berlin edited by Ludger Derenthal and Jadwiga Kamola, Kehrer Verlag: Heidelberg, Berlin 2018.
- Andreas Kilb, Dem Vergessen bei der Arbeit zuschauen. Views and counter-views of geniuses and their thoughts: Berlin's Museum für Fotografie presents portraits of great artists from Angelika Platen's collection, in: FAZ, 2 July 2018, online.
- Elke Buhr, Portfolio. Angelika Platen. Künstlerinnen, in: Monopol (magazine), October 2018, last accessed 18 May 2022.
- Elke Buhr, Angelika Platen's Portraits. Changed focus, in: Monopol, 10 May 2021, last accessed 18 May 2022.
- Angelika Platen. Meine Frauen, with texts by Swantje Karich and an interview with Julia Voss, Hatje Cantz: Berlin 2021, ISBN 978-3-7757-4881-0.
- Freddy Langer, Photographer Angelika Platen. The Art of Seduction, in: FAZ, 19 February 2022, online
- Portfolio Angelika Platen. Meine Frauen, in: brennpunkt 3/2022, pp. 56–71.
