= Patrick Van Antwerpen =

- Born: 17 May 1944; Ixelles, Belgium
- Died: 3 December 1990 (aged 46); Ixelles, Belgium
- Occupations: author, filmmaker

Patrick Van Antwerpen was a Belgian author-filmmaker born on 17 May 1944 in Ixelles (Brussels) and died in this commune on 3 December 1990.

== Filmographie ==
- Jules, Julien, Julienne (1968)
- La baraque (1970)
- Le banc (1973)
- L'autobus (1974)
- Lismonde (1978)
- L'air du large (1979)
- Un joli petit coin (1980)
- Rue de l'arbre unique (1983)
- Vivement ce soir (1985)
- Le monde des Spocks (1988), film d'animation réalisé avec des enfants de l'atelier Graphoui
- Jeux d'enfants (1990), film documentaire de 40 minutes, tourné en Hi-8 transféré en 16mm, sur des enfants fréquentant les centres d'expression et de créativité de la Communauté française de Jette et Mouscron. Le montage a été terminé après la décès du cinéaste par Béatrice Haché, son assistante depuis 1987.
- Gilles Ehrmann photographe, inachevé en raison de la mort du cinéaste
