= Réalités (French magazine) =

French postwar magazine (1946-1981)

- Editor: Alfred Max, Artistic director Alfred Brandler to 1950, then Albert Gilou
- Frequency: monthly
- Circulation: 160,000
- Publisher: Société d'études et de publications économiques; from 1960 Hachette
- Founder: Humbert Frerejean and Didier Rémon
- Founded: February 1946
- First issue: February 1946; 80 years ago
- Final issue: 1981
- Country: France
- Language: French, with English and Japanese editions
- ISSN: 0996-2204
- OCLC: 637533082

Réalités was a French monthly of the post World War II era which commenced publication in February 1946, flourishing during the Trente Glorieuses, a period of optimism, recovery and prosperity in France after the austerity of Occupation, ceasing in 1978 in France. The US edition continued until 1981.

Its articles ranged across French culture, economy and politics, and featured profusely illustrated stories of interest to tourists, especially those traveling to French colonies. It was the flagship title of a press group, Société d'études et de publications économiques (SEPE) (Society of studies and business publications) incorporating Connaissance des Arts, Vision, Entreprise, etc.

== Editorial objectives ==
In November 1946, Didier Rémon created Société d'études et de publications économiques (SEPE) (Society of studies and business publications), registering Réalités as a press and publishing group. The magazine's founders were entrepreneurs Humbert Frerejean (1914-2001) and Didier Rémon (1922–), the editor Alfred Max, and first artistic director Alfred Brandler, replaced in 1950, when an English edition was launched, by Albert Gilou.

They proclaimed an intention to produce a high-class, profusely illustrated publication which was to be outward-looking, an 'observatory on the world', after the years of Occupation during which information about the rest of the world was restricted. In a mission statement they expressed interest in leading readers to discover "how the other lives, whether a thousand kilometers away or close by, how they eat, dress, work, love, entertain". ("Comment vit l'autre, à des milleurs de kilomètres ou à proximité, comment il mange, s'habille, travail, aime, s'amuse.").

From 1947 the magazine included a literary supplement, with theatre plays, novels, or topical documents, and other supplements and special issues devoted to visual arts, fashion, business affairs, children and youth, followed. In November 1956, after 130 issues, the title merged with Femina-Illustration founded by Hélène Gordon-Lazareff. Its offices were then installed in the L'Illustration building, at 13 rue Saint-Georges (Paris). Until May 1964, the magazine was called Réalités Femina-Illustration, having absorbed the old Monde illustré in the process.

From 1960 Réalités became part of the Hachette group. In June 1964, Réalités resumed its original title and came under the direction of Robert Salmon. After number 390, the title merged in December 1978 with Le Spectacle du monde.

== Readership and influence ==
Colourful, slick and glossy, in a large format 31.5 x 24.3 cm (slightly larger than 8 ½” x 11”), and costing 150 francs per issue (approximately the value of $US25-$US30 in 2015), Réalités catered to the sophisticated and wealthy reader. In its early years at least, on average, 160,000 copies were distributed each month, mostly by subscription, but readership was one million. Its content included stories on the economy and politics alongside articles of interest to tourists and on French culture.

The publisher of Réalités, the Société d'études et publications économiques, received funding from the 'Mission France' initiative of the Marshall Plan. It therefore also served to promote American culture and political influence in France and Europe, which was prompted by a pervasive American francophilia and perception of France as a frontier against Nazi resurgence and communist influence. Copies were circulated in Hungary and Czechoslovakia.

From as early as 1952 the magazine was also issued in the UK in an English language edition. There was an edition for the United States, Réalités in America, 1950–1974, later relaunched in January 1979 as Réalités but ceasing publication again in 1981. In 1971, a Japanese-language version was launched.

Contributors included:

- Hervé Bazin (1911-1996)
- Michel Beurdeley (1911-2012)
- Michel del Castillo (1933-)
- Michel Drancourt (1928-2014)
- Maurice Druon (1918-2009)
- Daphne du Maurier (1907-1989)
- Claudine Escoffier-Lambiotte (1923-1996)
- André Fontaine (1921-2013)
- Cecil Scott Forester (1899-1966)
- Pierre Gosset (1911-1982)
- Renée Gosset (1918-1998)
- Robert Guillain (1908-1998)
- John Gunther (1901-1970)
- Paul Guth (1910-1997)
- Thor Heyerdahl (1914-2002)
- Danielle Hunebelle (1922-2013)
- Julian Huxley (1887-1975)
- Claude Lévi-Strauss (1908-2009)
- John P. Marquand (1893-1960)
- François Mauriac (1885-1970)
- André Maurois (1885-1967)
- Alfred Max (1914-1990)
- Tibor Mende (1915-1984)
- Marcel Mithois (1922-2012)
- Henry de Montherlant (1895-1972)
- Henri Perruchot (1917-1967)
- Jacqueline Piatier (1921-2001)
- Tanneguy de Quénétain (1925-2010)
- Jules Romains (1885-1972)
- Philippe Sollers (1936-)
- Michel Tatu (1933-2012)
- Maurice Toesca (1904-1998)
- Pierre Viansson-Ponté (1920-1979)
- Paul-Émile Victor (1907-1995)

== Photography ==
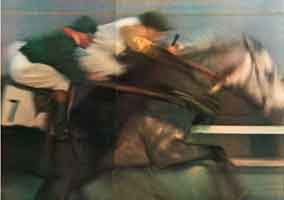
A double-page spread by Jean-Louis Swiners illustrating the article 'Le cheval de course' ('Racehorse') in February 1959 issue, p. 44-45.

Photography was given central place in the magazine under art director Albert Gilou. In 1949, photographs replaced the hand-drawn illustration which had hitherto appeared on each cover of Réalités. Covers were devoted to photos which would generate surprise, intrigue or mystery, but not shock or horror. All sorts of images were employed but the dominant genre, at least through the early years, was humanist photography, in particular that of staffers Édouard Boubat and Jean-Philippe Charbonnier, espousing the optimistic values of the contemporary exhibition The Family of Man in which both exhibited.

An emphasis on photography helped promote the reputation of the publication. Among the photographers (of whom, after 1950, Édouard Boubat, Jean-Philippe Charbonnier, Gilles Ehrmann and Jean-Louis Swiners became salaried employees) were contributors:

- Manuel Álvarez Bravo (1902-2002)
- Richard Avedon (1923-2004)
- Cecil Beaton (1904-1980)
- Erwin Blumenfeld (1897-1969)
- Noël Boyer (1883-1967)
- René Burri
- Robert Capa (1913-1954)
- Henri Cartier-Bresson (1908-2004)
- Michel Clément (1924-)
- Jerry Cooke (1921-2005)
- Michel Desjardins (1933-)
- Robert Doisneau (1912-1994)
- Gilles Ehrmann (1928-2005)
- Ernst Haas (1921-1986)
- Frank Horvat (1928-2020)
- Richard Kalvar (1944-)
- William Klein (1928-)
- François Kollar (1904-1979)
- Guy Le Querrec (1941-)
- Harry Meerson (1910-1991)
- Gjon Mili (1904-1984)
- Pierre-Louis Millet (1927-)
- Irving Penn
- Carl Perutz (1921-1981)
- Bernard Plossu (1945-)
- Paul Popper (1933-1969)
- Émile Savitry
- Roger Schall (1904-1995)
- Edward Steichen
- André Steiner (1901-1978)
- Dennis Stock (1928-2010)
- William Eugene Smith (1918-1978) ;
- Jean-Pierre Sudre (1921-1997)
- Sabine Weiss (1924-2021)
- Edward Weston (1886-1958)

At first, each issue carried sixty pictures in black and white, though the magazine printed colour photographs from 1950. From the mid sixties, most images were in colour, almost exclusively so from the late sixties. Photo essays often extended over twenty pages. Edouard Boubat, who was on staff 1951–1965, described the experience of working for Réalités:

"It was beautiful, and very educational for us, really exciting in that we were not necessarily sent to the "hotspots" of the world, [in fact] sometimes going where nothing was happening, and there's nothing to grab. Then one really understands the reality of a country, of a situation. Escaping the news, or what we call the news, and is often a tragic smokescreen that hides the deeper reality, it's an opportunity.".

== Cessation ==
Réalités magazine was most influential between the years 1950 and 1970, employing a journalistic style of long articles associated with pictorial illustration which is now generally replaced by other media. Its last French edition was published in December 1978 with the number 390, and it was then absorbed by Le Spectacle du Monde. The US edition was relaunched in January 1979, although it only lasted two years.

In 1973, Réalités was criticised by the left-wing essayist Guy Debord in his film La Société du spectacle.

A retrospective of the magazine was exhibited 16 January–30 March 2008 at the Maison européenne de la photographie (MEP) in Paris, accompanied by a book by historian Anne de Mondenard and journalist Michel Guerrin.
