= Les 30 × 40 =

Photography club

Les 30 × 40 or Le Club photographique de Paris was a photography club created in Paris in 1952 by Roger Doloy who was its president, with vice-president Jean-Claude Gautrand, photographer and author, and honorary president Jean-Pierre Sudre, professional photographer.

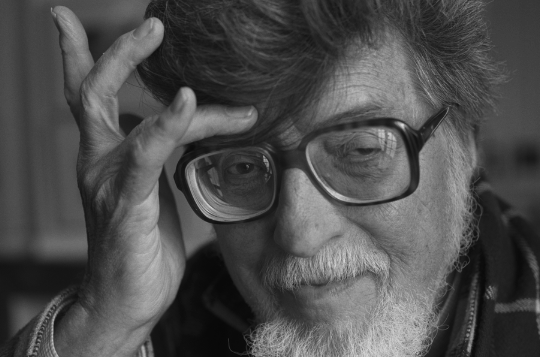
Roger Doloy, 1997, photographer

The club produced a bimonthly mimeographed A4 publication Jeune Photographie and regularly organised exhibitions in the lobby of Studio 28, a cinema located at 28, rue Tholozé in Paris.

Amongst its members it boasted six Prix Niépce winners: Jean Dieuzaide, Robert Doisneau, Jean-Pierre Ducatez, Léon Herschtritt, Jean-Louis Swiners and Patrick Zachmann.

The club disbanded in 1998.

== History ==
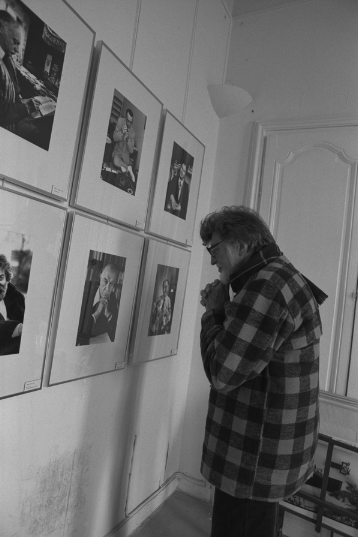
Roger Doloy at an exhibition of photographic portraits (in 1997)

The club was formed against a rise in amateurism in French photography amongst a more prosperous, mobile and leisured populace, spurred by a proliferation of clubs and societies and supported by chemical and equipment supplier Kodak, whose factories at Vincennes, Sevran and Chalon-sur-Saône were in full production, and which offered prizes and sponsored magazines for both amateurs and professionals; Photo-Ciné Revue, Ciné-Photo, Le Photographe, and L'Officiel de la photographie. In 1958, the exclusive and increasingly insular and self-serving professionals of Le Groupe des XV held its last exhibition at the Grand Palais, during the Salon des Artistes décorateurs, to an indifferent reception.

Lucien Clergue denounced what he and others saw as a pervasive, backward-looking, mediocrity and self-congratulation awarded by meaningless prizes. The Photographic Club of Paris marked a break with amateurism, and was known ironically as "Les 30 × 40" (sometimes represented as '30/40'), for the minimum dimensions required of prints presented at official exhibitions of the type organised by the National Federation of Photographic Societies of France.

Its initiator Roger Doloy, was a hospital administration employee and organised most of the weekly sessions, exhibitions, meetings, and internships. Finding inspiration in Daniel Masclet, who had been excluded from the Group of XV for his outspokenness, Doloy made him the honorary president of the club. Though at first opposed by Jean-Louis Swiners, Masclet prevailed by dint of his commitment and persistence.

== Activities and ethos ==
The club attracted professionals who recognised its mission; photographers, curators, gallery owners, laboratory technicians, including Jean-Claude Lemagny, curator at the Bibliothèque Nationale, Michel Quétin, curator at the National Archives, gallery owner Agathe Gaillard, and Claude Mollard, senior civil servant and future president of the National Centre for Photography, as well as amateurs who came to rub shoulders with the five Niépce Award-winners who frequented the meetings.

Registered at 52 rue Custine, a few streets north of Sacre Coeur, the organisation met every Thursday in the salons of the Club Alpine, 10 rue La Boétie, 75008 Paris, then at the Maison pour Tous (rue Mouffetard) and at the Centre International de Séjour in Paris. After a discussion of current exhibitions of photography (and other media), the members of the club, followed by their guests, presented their work and received a critique, in particular from Daniel Masclet, a seasoned photographer, who was present at all the sessions and seated in "His" armchair, in the first row. Professionals and amateurs confronted each other in critiques and debates in which Jean-Philippe Charbonnier was prominent, while the young guard, represented by Jean-Pierre Ducatez, Léon Herschtritt, Michel Kempf and Yvette Troispoux, rebelled against conformism and amateurism, and challenged their elders whose ambition had flagged, and asserted their point of view to defend an uncompromising conception of photography.

At a time when books on the history of photography were rare, or inaccessible, or centred on technique, the group provided a source of information; Jean-Louis Swiners, a Life magazine subscriber, shared the photographic essays of W. Eugene Smith, and Man Ray and Brassaï themselves presented on occasion, though even they were not immune to criticism from more militant members. Dealer André Jammes, collector of 19th century prints, showed his collection from the Missions Héliographiques, of Atget, or of neglected photographers from the School of Paris.

The reputation of the club was such that it hosted the significant American, European and other photographers passing through Paris. Few were the weeks when a foreign international photographer was not present on Thursday.

The club regularly organised exhibitions at Studio 28, rue Tholozé in the 18th arrondissement of Paris, and in Leningrad and London.

=== Jeune Photographie ===
Aside from occasional catalogues of their exhibitions, from 1952 the club issued Jeune Photographie, an internal bimonthly of twenty mimeographed and stapled pages which compensated for its lack of pictures with the quality of its writing. Initially an information bulletin, it came to host strenuous debates between Swiners and photography historian Michel Francois Braive and the pronouncements of Gautrand or Lemagny. A keen subscriber was Ansel Adams, who submitted an article. However, lacking subsidies or sponsors, patrons or advertisements, from 1968 to 1974 the newsletter appeared only intermittently, and ceased publication in 1976. A new and short-lived publication, Les Cahiers des 30 × 40, replaced Jeune Photographie for 8 issues, until 1980.

=== May 1968 ===
Members, with Henri Cartier-Bresson, William Klein and even Marc Riboud, covered the events of May 68 on a daily basis, which they documented in hundreds of pictures, many not published at the time, that were exhibited in a permanent and daily exhibition in their premises, at the Maison des jeunes, rue Mouffetard in the 5th arrondissement.

== Influence ==
Similar clubs, inspired by Les 30 × 40, appeared in Italy, Spain, Holland and Belgium. The first years of the Rencontres internationales de la photographie echoed the aesthetics and hosted the more prominent members of Les 30 × 40. For the 1975 festival, with Les 30 × 40, Gautrand organized "9 young photographers sponsored by 9 great photographers".

== Demise ==
The Club held an exhibition marking its 25th anniversary (1975) with a catalogue, of portraits of members and photographs by them. In 1977, after the accidental death of his wife, Doloy retired to Grignan and created, in 1978, La Photographie à Grignan. In 1995, Francis Richard became the last president and the following year, in Arles, an exhibition brought together the photographs of the members of the club. In 1997, Les 30 × 40 exhibited in Grignan at Doloy's, who died the following year in 1998, when the club ceased to operate.

== Some members ==
- Pierre-Jean Amar
- Christiane Barrier
- John Batho
- Jean-Philippe Charbonnier
- Arnaud Claas
- Alain Cognard
- Jean Dieuzaide
- Robert Doisneau
- Jean-Pierre Ducatez
- Agathe Gaillard
- Jean-Claude Gautrand
- Léon Herschtritt
- Bernard Just
- Michel Kempf
- Daniel Lebée
- Jean-Claude Lemagny
- Daniel Masclet
- Jean-Jacques Meusy
- Francis Richard
- Willy Ronis
- Louis-Victor Emmanuel Sougez
- Jean-Pierre Sudre (honorary president)
- Jean-Louis Swiners
- Patrick Taberna
- Yvette Troispoux
- Raoul Vaslin
- Alexandre Vitkine
- Patrick Zachmann
- Xavier Zimbardo

== Bibliography ==
- Roger Doloy, ed. Association Traces, Joinville-le-Pont, 1999 (ISBN 978-2-913948-00-6)
- Céline Gautier, Aurélie Aujard, Mademoiselle Yvette Troispoux photographe, Contrejour, 2012.
- Agathe Gaillard, Mémoire d’une galerie, Gallimard, 2013.
