= Hanne Darboven =

German artist (1941–2009)

- Hanne Darboven, 1968 by Angelika Platen
- Born: 29 April 1941; Munich
- Died: 9 March 2009 (aged 67); Hamburg
- Education: Hochschule für bildende Künste Hamburg
- Movement: Conceptual art
- Website: www.hanne-darboven.org

Hanne Darboven (29 April 1941 – 9 March 2009) was a German conceptual artist, best known for her large-scale minimalist installations consisting of handwritten tables of numbers.

== Early life and career ==
Darboven was born in 1941 in Munich. She grew up in Rönneburg, a southern suburb of Hamburg, as the second of three daughters of Cäsar Darboven and Kirsten Darboven. Her father was a successful and well-to-do businessman in Hamburg; the family brand J. J. Darboven is well known in Germany.

Following a brief period in which she studied as a pianist, Darboven studied art with Willem Grimm, Theo Garve and Almir Mavignier at the Hochschule für bildende Künste Hamburg from 1962 to 1965. From 1966 to 1968, she lived in New York City, at first in total isolation from the New York art scene. She then moved back to her family home in Hamburg and continued to live and work there among an extraordinary collection of disparate cultural artefacts until her death in 2009.

== Work ==
=== Konstruktionen ===
In the winter of 1966–1967, she met Sol LeWitt, Carl Andre and Joseph Kosuth, major figures in the then nascent fields of Minimalism and Conceptual art. These meetings proved pivotal in the development of Darboven's work; soon thereafter, she began her first series of drawings on millimeter paper with lists of numbers, which resulted from complicated additions or multiplications of personally derived numerical sequences based on the four to six digits used to notate the date, month, and year of the standard Gregorian calendar. The calendar sequence has consistently formed the basis for the majority of her installations, and the ‘daily arithmetic’ consisting of checksums came to replace the year's calendrical progression according to a complex and challenging mathematical logic. Always written out by hand, her paperwork thus comprised rows and rows of ascending and descending numbers, u-shapes, grids, line-notations and boxes. Employing this neutral language of numbers and using pen, pencil, the typewriter, and graph paper as materials, she began to make simple linear constructions of numbers that she called Konstruktionen. Similar to On Kawara, Darboven offered a system to represent time as both the continuous flux of life and clear embracing order. Along with LeWitt and Andre, Lucy Lippard and Kasper König belonged to the circle of long-standing promoters of Darboven's work.

In the 1970s, Darboven often allied her work, which she considered a form of writing, to the accomplishments of writers such as Heinrich Heine and Jean-Paul Sartre, directly transcribing quotations or entire passages of their texts, or translating them into patterns. By 1978, Darboven was also incorporating visual documents, such as photographic images and assorted objects that she found, purchased, or received as gifts. Doing so, she addressed specifically historical issues. The monumental work entitled Vier Jahreszeiten (Four seasons) (1981), which Darboven exhibited at Documenta 7 in Kassel, was the first of Darboven's works to be really permeated with color, introduced into it by the use of kitsch postcards.

Also in 1978, she first conceived her first large-scale installations. Ever since, Darboven's work has often occupied large spaces: her installation Cultural History 1880–1983, (1980–1983) with its 1,589 individually framed works on paper of uniform format and 19 sculptural elements takes up 7,000 square feet. Reducing the Gregorian calendrical notation to only forty-two denominations for each century, the work weaves together cultural, social, and historical references with autobiographical documents, postcards, pinups of film and rock stars, documentary references to the first and second world wars, geometric diagrams for textile weaving, a sampling of New York doorways, illustrated covers from news magazines, the contents of an exhibition catalogue devoted to postwar European and American art, a kitschy literary calendar, and extracts from some of Darboven's earlier works.

An example of Darboven's work during her most prolific period is Sunrise / Sunset, New York, NYC, today. The work has been made in 1984 and consists of 385 drawings of felt pen on graph paper. The size is 31 x 35 cm each. The first drawing of each month is decorated with a nostalgic postcard showing prominent spots and picturesque scenes of past New York. The first drawing of each month is titled heute ("today"). All other days of the month are numbered consecutively. The total work is hung in monthly blocks of 30 or 31 day-drawings additional to the introductory postcard-drawing. Altogether the work represents a time period of living and working and at the same time evokes nostalgic memories of the past. Less minimalist, South Korean Calendar, 1991 presents pages from a South Korean calendar, with the days of the month marked in large Roman numerals that occasionally turn from black to red or blue for no obvious reason. The numerals are filled with a lacelike pattern of white dots and surrounded by a host of colorful details: little blue drawings of diamond rings and stainless steel wristwatches, yin-yang signs, elegant Korean characters.

=== Mathematical Music ===
In the 1980s, Darboven further expanded her scope by including musical arrangements and photographs in her displays. In her so-called “Mathematical Music”, she converted the numbers contained in her rows and columns into sounds. Numbers were assigned to certain notes, and numerical series translated into musical scores. With the aid of a collaborator, Darboven adapted them into performable compositions for organ, double bass, harpsichord, string quartet, and chamber orchestra. She translated her additive concept of dates into musical scores, in which the digit 1 stands for the note e, 2 for f, 3 for g, etc. Compound numbers are expressed as an interval of two notes, e.g. 31=g-e, 24=f-h, etc., and numbers combined with 0 are used as broken chords. Hanne Darboven: ‘My systems are numeric concepts that work according to the laws of progression and/or reduction in the manner of a musical theme with variations.’ Wende 80 (Turning point 80) (1980), using an interview with Helmut Schmidt and Franz Josef Strauss, is the first piece in Darboven's work which is simultaneously a musical score. This music is preserved on 11 long-playing records in a black case (an edition of 250 was pressed).

Originally shown in Documenta 11 (2002) as a collection of loose pages in folders, the monumental Wunschkonzert (1984) consists of 1008 pages of uniform size divided into 4 Opus's (Opus 17a and b and Opus 18a and b). Each Opus comprises 36 poems, and each poem is made of 6 pages plus a title page on which an antiquarian greeting card celebrating a Christian confirmation has been collaged. The poems reveal a rhythmic movement in their increasing and decreasing rows of numbers, and the checksum values are represented in digits and line-notations (17a, 18a) or by digits entered into a grid (17b, 18b). This work adopts musical methods of movement and repetitive rhythms and was conceived against the backdrop of musical compositions by the artist.

== Legacy ==
Established in 2000 and named after its founder, the Hanne Darboven Foundation promotes contemporary art by supporting young talents, which, in particular, tackle the theme of ‘space and time’ in the realms of conceptual art, visual arts, compositions, and literature. The heir of the artist's estate, the foundation recorded Darboven's complete Requiem Cycle. In order to preserve the artist's work and make parts of her own collection available to the public, the foundation purchased her former Rönneburg residence in 2012.

== Exhibitions ==
Hanne Darboven's works have been presented in numerous exhibitions in Germany and abroad. Her first solo exhibition outside Germany took place at Art & Project, Amsterdam, in 1970. The exhibition of her two-part work Card Index: Filing Cabinet (1975), simultaneously held in two New York galleries in 1978, was the first time that Darboven had shown her work in the United States, following a decision to stop exhibiting temporarily in 1976. Darboven has since had numerous one-person exhibitions primarily in Europe and North America, including major presentations at the Deichtorhallen, Hamburg; the Van Abbemuseum, Eindhoven; and the Dia Center for the Arts, New York. Individual works by Darboven were already included in the Documenta 5, 6 and 7, and in 1982 she represented the Federal Republic of Germany at the Venice Biennale (along with Gotthard Graubner and Wolfgang Laib). At the Documenta 11 her oeuvre was shown in all its many facets on three floors of the Fridericianum in Kassel, making it the "centerpiece of the exhibition" with more than 4,000 drawings. In 2023, the Menil Drawing Institute at the Menil Collection curated an exhibition that explored the intertwining of writing and drawing that formed the core of the artist's practice throughout her career. This exhibition explored three defining motifs of the artist's work on paper: abstract drawing, date calculations, and monumental installations.

Darboven's work was first shown by Galerie Konrad Fischer. Gallerist Leo Castelli gave her nine shows between 1973 and 1995. Count Panza bought several of her works. Today Darboven's work is represented by Konrad Fischer Gallery and Sprüth Magers.

== Awards (selection) ==
- 1985 Edwin-Scharff-Preis of the city of Hamburg
- 1994 Lichtwark-Preis of the city of Hamburg
- 1997 Member of the Akademie der Künste in Berlin

== Public collections (selection) ==
- ARCO Foundation Collection, Madrid
- Centre Georges Pompidou, Paris
- Dia:Beacon, Beacon / NY
- Dia:Chelsea, New York
- FRAC Grand-Large-Hauts-de-France (fr), Dunkerque
- Hamburger Bahnhof, Berlin
- Hamburger Kunsthalle, Hamburg
- Kaiser-Wilhelm-Museum, Krefeld
- Ludwig Forum für Internationale Kunst, Aachen
- MADRE, Naples
- Museum Abteiberg, Mönchengladbach
- Museum für Moderne Kunst, Frankfurt am Main
- Museum Küppersmühle, Duisburg
- National Museum of Art, Architecture and Design, Oslo
- Bundeskunstsammlung, Bonn
- Schaulager, Basel
- Stedelijk Museum voor Actuele Kunst (S.M.A.K.) in Gent

== See also ==
- List of German women artists
