= Frank Horvat =

Italian photographer (1928–2020)

- Born: 28 April 1928; Abbazia, Italy (today Opatija, part of Croatia)
- Died: 21 October 2020 (aged 92); Paris, France
- Occupation: Photographer
- Known for: Fashion photography

Frank Horvat (28 April 1928 – 21 October 2020) was an Italian photographer who lived and worked in France. He is best known for his fashion photography, published between the mid 1950s and the late 1980s. Horvat's photographic opus includes photojournalism, portraiture, landscape, nature, and sculpture. He was the recipient of the Fondazione del Centenario Award in 2010 for his contributions to European culture.

He has collaborated with fellow photographers such as Don McCullin, Robert Doisneau, Sarah Moon, Helmut Newton, and Marc Riboud. In the 1990s, he was one of the first major photographers to experiment with technology including photoshop.

== Early life ==
Horvat was born in Abbazia, Italy (now Opatija, Croatia), on 28 April 1928, into a Jewish family from Central Europe. His father, Karl, was a Hungarian general physician, and his mother, Adele, was a psychiatrist from Vienna. At the age of 11, in 1939, his family moved to Lugano in Switzerland, fleeing fascism in Italy. He went on to study fine art at Brera Academy in Milan. Horvat lived in several countries including Switzerland, Italy, Pakistan, India, England, and the United States, before settling in France in 1955.

== Career ==
=== 1950s ===
Horvat started his career in the mid 1950s as a photojournalist in Paris, working to capture the 'sleaze and squalor' of the city, before going on to fashion photography. He acknowledged having been strongly influenced by French humanist photographer Henri Cartier-Bresson. After meeting him in 1950, he followed his advice and replaced his Rollei with a Leica camera and embarked on a two-year journey through Asia as a free-lance photojournalist. His photographs from this trip were published by Life, Réalités, Match, Picture Post, Die Woche, and Revue. His photograph of an Indian bride under a veil, her face reflected in a mirror on her lap, was selected by Edward Steichen for The Family of Man exhibit at the Museum of Modern Art which toured the world to be seen by 9 million visitors.

In 1955, Horvat moved from London to Paris and found that the mood of its streets and its inhabitants had little in common with the somewhat romantic vision of the so-called humanist photographers. In 1957, Horvat shot fashion photographs for Jardin des Modes using a 35-mm camera and available light, which formerly had rarely been used for fashion. This innovation was welcomed by ready-to-wear designers, because it presented their creations in the context of everyday life. In the following years, Horvat was commissioned to do similar work for Elle in Paris, Vogue in London, and Harper’s Bazaar in New York.

=== 1960s and 1970s ===
Between 1962 and 1963, Horvat turned to photojournalism and took a trip around the world for the German magazine Revue. Then he experimented with cinema and video. In 1976, he decided to "become his own client" by producing three personal projects: Portraits of Trees (1976–82), Very Similar (1982-86) and New York Up and Down (1982–87), which he called his "triptych".

=== 1980s ===
In this period, Horvat went on towards color photography including his series New York Up and Down, where he extensively shot portraits of passengers on New York's subway systems and coffee shops. This was also period when his eyesight started to fail from an eye disease. It was then that he began a new project, a series of interviews with fellow photographers, such as Edouard Boubat, Robert Doisneau, Mario Giacomelli, Josef Koudelka, Don McCullin, Sarah Moon, Helmut Newton, Marc Riboud, Jeanloup Sieff and Joel-Peter Witkin. They were published in France under the title Entre Vues.

=== 1990s ===
In the 1990s, Horvat became interested in computer technology and produced Yao the Cat (1993), Bestiary (1994), and Ovid’s Metamorphoses (1995). He transgressed the Cartier-Bressonian rule of the "decisive moment" by combining parts of images shot at different times and in different places. Several years later, he produced A Trip to Carrara. This was also the period that he was one of the first photographers to experiment with Photoshop.

=== Themes ===
Women played a central thematic role in his fashion journalistic works, with a focus on realism. Speaking about women in his photography and his emphasis on natural looks, he said, “I was interested in women. I wanted to show what I liked about them. They would spend two hours in the makeup chair, and I’d try to get them to remove it so they’d look more natural.” In his own words, he kept away from pictures of war, disease, and suffering, "not out of indifference to these misfortunes, but because I feel neither the moral justification nor the physical courage to face such situations as a photographer.” However, his early photojournalistic works of Paris, had him focus on the city's seedy underbelly to counter the 'heavily romanticized' depictions of the city.

== Later years ==
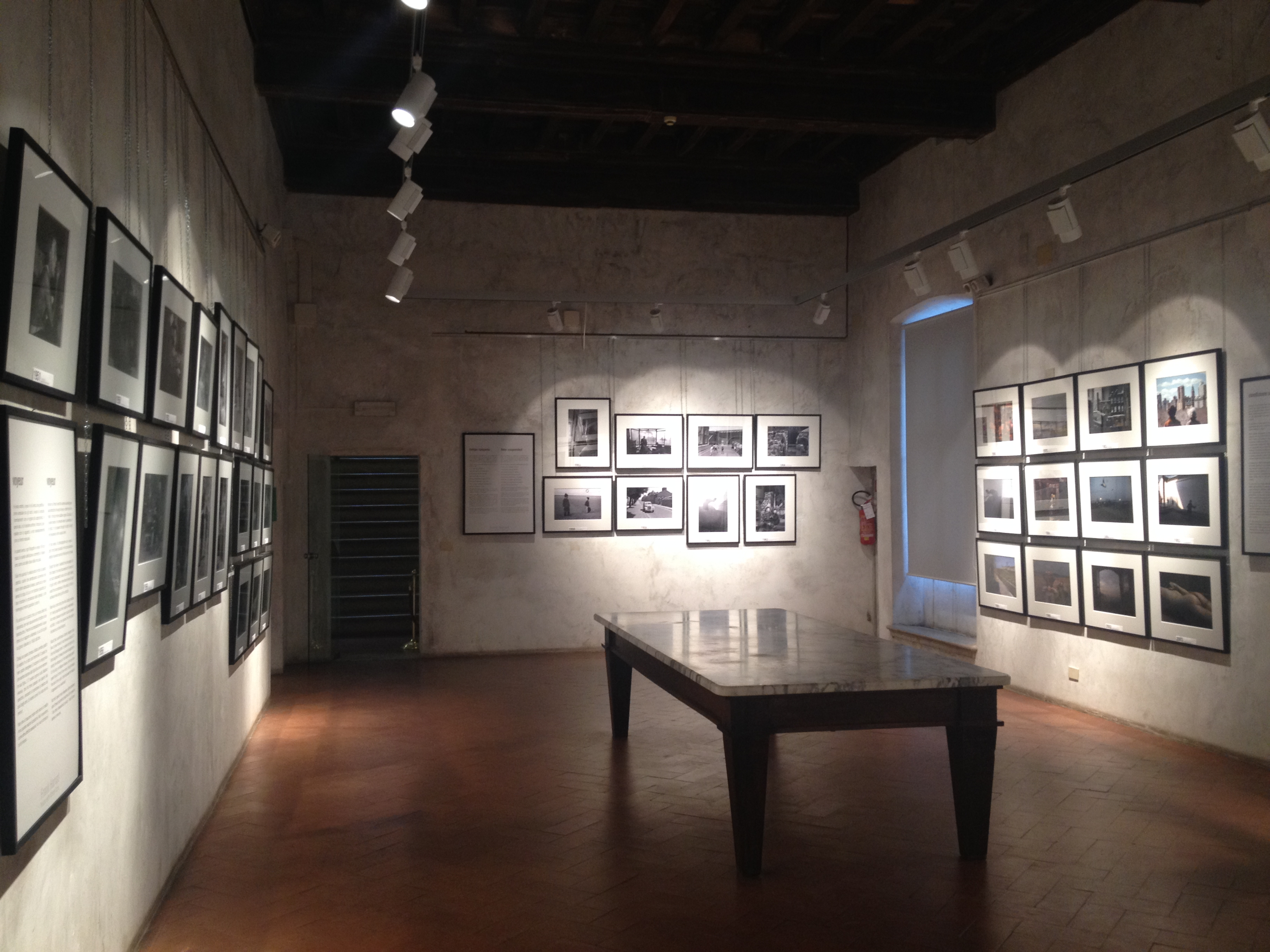
House of Fifteen Keys, retrospective exhibition, Palazzo Mediceo di Seravezza, Seravezza Lucca, Italy (2014)

Horvat's later projects were perhaps his most personal. 1999 is a photo-diary of the last year of the millennium, shot with a tiny analog camera designed for amateurs. Entre Vues and La Véronique were taken with the first digital Nikon within a 30-meter range, either inside his home in Provence or in its immediate surroundings. Eye at the Fingertips, which was started in 2006, was photographed with a digital compact camera. His latest enterprise was an iPad application called Horvatland, which contains more than 2,000 photos produced over the course of 65 years with ten hours of commentary. He received the Fondazione del Centenario Award (based in Lugano, Switzerland) in 2010, for his contribution to European culture.

Horvat's latest book, Side Walk, showcasing life in New York city in the 1980s, is to be published on 26 October 2020. He died on 21 October 2020 at the age of 92.

== Publications ==
- 1957: La capture des éléphants sauvages. Louvois, Paris. ASIN B003WPVD3I.
- 1962: J'aime la télévision. Rencontre, Lausanne, Switzerland. Text by Max Egli. ASIN B00J7TN9MQ.
- 1962: J'aime le strip-tease. Rencontre, Lausanne, Switzerland. Text by Patrik Lindermohr. ASIN B00181B2TI.
- 1979: The Tree. Aurum, London and Little, Brown, New York. Text by John Fowles. ISBN 0906053048.
- 1982: Goethe in Sicilia. Novecento, Palermo, Italy.
- 1990: Entre vues. Nathan, Paris. ISBN 9782092400333.
- 1991: Degas sculptures. Imprimerie nationale, Paris. ISBN 9782110811424.
- 1992: Yao le chat botté. Gautier-Languereau, Paris. ISBN 9782010200731.
- 1994: Arbres. Imprimerie nationale, Paris. ISBN 9782110813091.
- 1994: Le Bestiaire d’Horvat. CNP; Actes Sud. ISBN 9782742703739.
- 1996: Paris-Londres. London-Paris, Ville de Paris. ISBN 9782879002910.
- 1996: De la Mode et des Jardins. Imprimerie Nationale, Paris. ISBN 9782743301644.
- 1998: 51 Photographs in Black and White. Dewi Lewis, Manchester. ISBN 9781899235469.
- 1999: Very Similar. Dewi Lewis, Manchester. ISBN 9781899235575.
- 2000: Frank Horvat. Photopoche no 88, Delpire; Nathan, Paris. ISBN 9782097541437.
- 2000: 1999: A Daily Report. Dewi Lewis, Manchester. ISBN 9781899235186.
- 2001: Figures romanes. Seuil, Paris. ISBN 9782020933841.
- 2002: Homenatge a Catalunya. Foundation Privada Vila Casas, Barcelona.
- 2004: Time Machine – a trip around the world. 1962–1963. OFF, Boulogne-Billancourt, France.
- 2004: La Véronique, thirty meters around my house in Provence. OFF / Horvat, Boulogne-Billancourt, France. With an introduction by Renaud Camus.
- 2005: Horvat photographie Couturier. Gallimard and Musée Maillol, Paris. ISBN 9782910826420.
- 2006: The Horvat Labyrinth. Chêne, Hachette, Paris. ISBN 9782842777203.
- 2008: De bocche-tette-culi-cazzi-e-mone. illustrations to the erotic poems by Zorzi Baffo, a Venetian aristocrat of the 18th century. OFF / Horvat, Boulogne-Billancourt, France.
- 2009: Adele Edelstein (About My Mother). OFF / Horvat, Boulogne-Billancourt, France.
- 2009: Dr. Karl Horvat (About My Father). OFF / Horvat, Boulogne-Billancourt, France.
- 2009: New York Up and Down. OFF / Horvat, Boulogne-Billancourt, France. With a text by Franz Kafka.
- 2009: Masken und Mandarinen. OFF / Horvat, Boulogne-Billancourt, France. with texts by the German poet Ingrid Mylo.
- 2013: House of Fifteen Keys. Terre Bleue. With texts by Jean-Noël Jeanneney. ISBN 978-2-909953-30-4.

== Exhibitions ==
- 2014 : House of Fifteen Keys, retrospective exhibition, Palazzo Mediceo di Seravezza, Seravezza Lucca, Italy.

== Filmography ==
- Le Procédé Fresson (1986) – by Jean Réal with Michel Fresson, Bernard Faucon, Bernard Plossu, Horvat, etc.
- Frank Horvat, 1999 – at Arte Television
- Fashion Horvat : Frank Horvat Exhibition in North Vancouver, 2012
