= Carl Perutz =

American photographer

Carl Perutz (1921-1981) was a New York photographer who was active from the 1930s through the 1970s covering a wide range of subject matter and in the genres of street photography, photojournalism, portraiture, fashion and advertising.

== Career ==
Perutz started taking photos in his teens in the 1930s. Fashion photography by him featured in Vogue as early as 1940 He joined the U.S. Army shortly after the Japanese attack on Pearl Harbor and served in the American Eighth Air Force as a reconnaissance photographer, flying in a B17 over North Africa, France and Germany. In the rank of Captain to which he rose in 1945, he worked on the ground behind enemy lines.

== Paris (1946–52) ==
He moved to Paris after the War and from there filed reports for Popular Photography magazine, and his correspondences indicate that he was using colour quite early for the work he undertook there from 1946 photographing fashion, writers, artists and stage and screen actors. In their September 29, 1947 issue LIFE magazine published his atmospheric picture of Juliette Gréco wearing men's trousers at Le Tabou. His unusually candid shot of fashion models – one smiling broadly at his camera – parading British designer Charles James’ gowns at the candlelit haute couture soirée at Plaza Athénée in Paris, was made in July 1947.

== Magnum ==
He shared an apartment in Paris with photojournalist Robert Capa (1913-54) who with Henri Cartier-Bresson, George Rodger and David Seymour was forming the Magnum agency (1947). Though he stamped ‘Magnum’ on his prints made in Paris (1947–52) and in New York (1952-58), and was credited as "Carl Perutz, Magnum" in issues of LIFE magazine into the 1950s, the agency does not recognise him as one of their official photographers and he does not appear in searches of their current website. Nevertheless, he is mentioned as ‘another member of Magnum” in a caption to his 1950 photograph of Robert Capa by Gael Elton Mayo, and by Cornell Capa (1918-2008), Robert's younger brother, and by Inge Morath (1923-2002).

== New York (1952–58) ==
Returning to America, Perutz worked for a variety of corporate and magazine clients. John G. Morris describes how he selected Perutz for stories on film and theatre because "he had been virtually born in the theatre". While his famous subjects included Helen Keller, Duke Ellington, Jimmy Durante, Roland Petit and other celebrities, it is for his photographs of Marilyn Monroe that Perutz is becoming best remembered.

On June 16, 1958, shortly before the movie star flew out to Hollywood to film Some Like It Hot, Perutz was contracted by the Hearst Corporation to conduct a photo-shoot with Monroe for their 1958 cover-story, “Milady’s Easter Bonnet” in The American Weekly Sunday supplement, for which six leading milliners to provide a hat for six well-known women; Monroe along with Kathy Grant Crosby, Lucille Ball, Elsa Maxwell, Eleanor Roosevelt and Mamie Eisenhower, wife of the President.

Perutz shot about sixty frames during this session in which Monroe wore several hats from Northridge's salon, including a black unblocked felt hat worn low over one eye, and the frame chosen for publication shows Monroe wearing a white, floppy hat. Silver gelatin prints were produced, and some bought by Monroe herself, although in publication the photographs were replaced with illustrations by Jon Whitcomb (1906–88) using Perutz's work as reference. The photograph itself features on the cover of Marilyn in fashion : the enduring influence of Marilyn Monroe.

== Personal life ==
Carl Perutz's marriage to Lida Livingston (1912–1977), manager of Margaret Ettinger's publicity firm, on Sept 25, 1952, was announced in Variety magazine, Wednesday, October 1, 1952, as well as the birth of their son Peter on May 21, 1953. Livingston formed her own public relations company in 1967 and counted Braniff Airlines, American Motors Corporation, Warren Avis, Helena Rubenstein, and Elizabeth Arden among her clients. Their marriage ended in divorce in 1967, and Lida died on September 17, 1977. Their son, Peter (Pete Livingston) survives.

== Exhibitions ==
- Pertutz's light-hearted observation of a woman on a New York ferry sheltering herself from rain and wind behind her taller male partner was featured in MoMA’s world-touring blockbuster exhibition and book The Family of Man curated by Edward Steichen.
- Posthumous joint exhibition with Louis Stettner of monochrome street photographs, still lives, from Paris and New York at Neikrug Photographics, 224 E. 68th, NYC, February 13 to March 9, 1985.

== Collections ==
- Museum of Modern Art (NY)
- Metropolitan Museum of New York
- Lincoln Center archives
