= Egidio Marzona =

German-Italian art collector (1944–2026)

- Born: 3 October 1944; Bielefeld, North Rhine-Westphalia, Germany
- Died: 15 March 2026 (aged 81); Berlin, Germany
- Occupations: Art collector, gallerist, publisher

Egidio Marzona (3 October 1944 – 15 March 2026) was a German-Italian art collector, gallerist and publisher. He collected artwork by Carl Andre, Bruce Nauman, and Lawrence Weiner, among others.

== Life and career ==
Marzona was born in Bielefeld, North Rhine-Westphalia, Germany on 3 October 1944. According to the Prussian Cultural Heritage Foundation, he acquired "one of the most extensive collections of 20th century art". Marzona died in Berlin on 15 March 2026, at the age of 81.
