= Jean-Pierre Sudre =

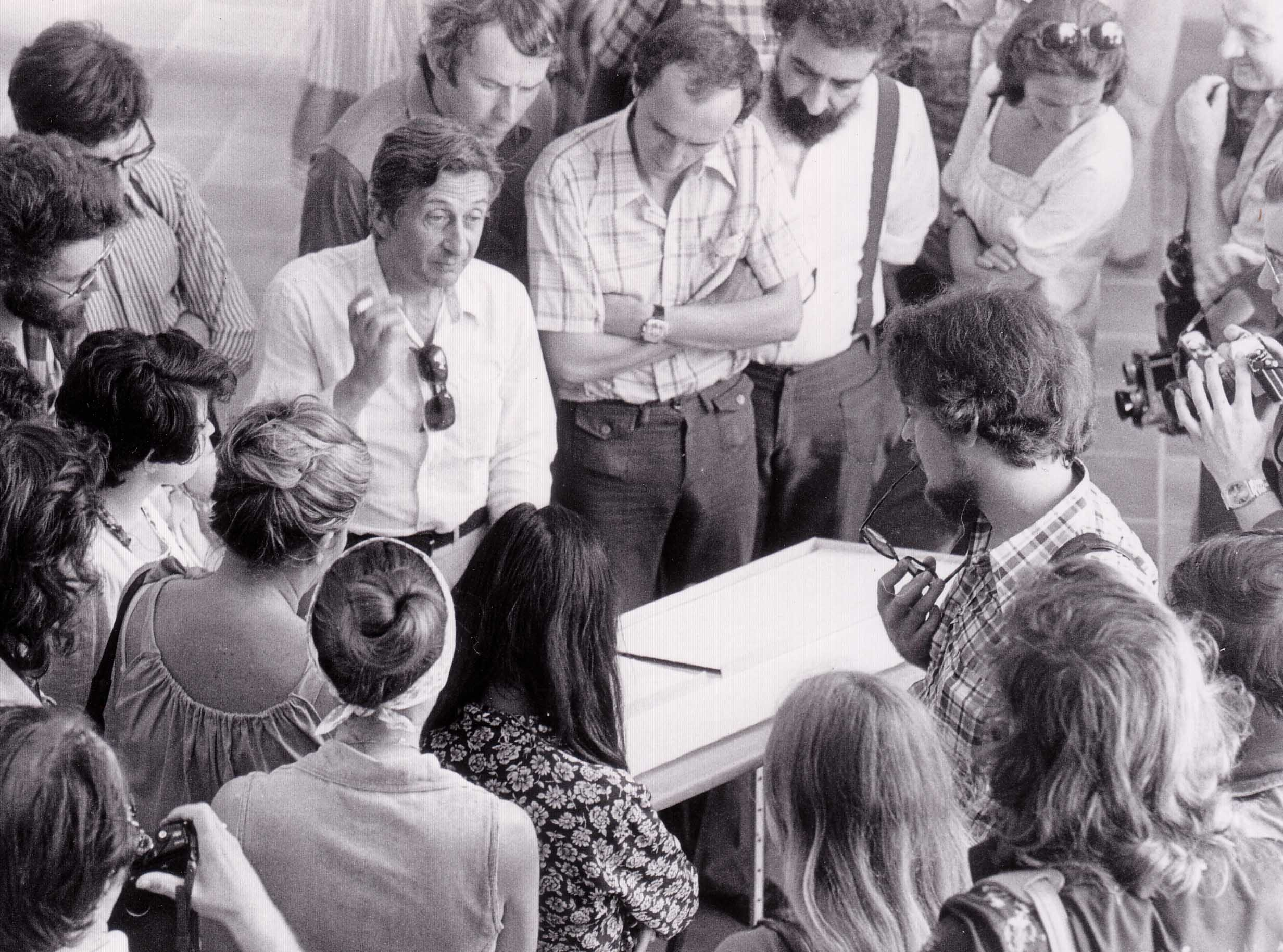
Jean-Pierre Sudre in his Southern France house, in 1975; the second person right to him (from viewer) is photographer Georges Tourdjman.

Jean-Pierre Sudre (French: [sydʁ]; September 27, 1921 – September 6, 1997) was a commercial photographer.

== Biography ==
Sudre was born in Paris but later moved to the south of France. There he devoted his life to workshops of fine art photography.

== Photography ==
Sudre's subject-matter was mainly the still-life and figure. He is best known for his experimentation with chemicals, and is credited with the creation of Mordançage (tr. 'etching', ' scouring'), though he built the process on the film reversal technique first documented in 1897 by Paul Liesegang and known as etch-bleach, bleach-etch, gelatin relief, or reverse relief.

== Recognition ==
On its foundation in 1952, Sudre was invited to become the honorary president of Les 30 x 40, Club Photographique de Paris in 1957 Sudre was awarded the Lion d'Or at the first Biennale Internationale de la Photographie at Venice, Italy.

In 1970, at the invitation of writer Michel Tournier, Sudre participated in the first Rencontres d'Arles as a guest of honour, and was included in first public evening meeting of three important 'Photographers of the Moment', with Brihat Denis and Jean-Philippe Charbonnier. Many photographers from all over France came to this event.

He died in Aix-en-Provence, aged 75, after a prolonged illness.
