= Édouard Boubat =

French photographer (1923–1999)

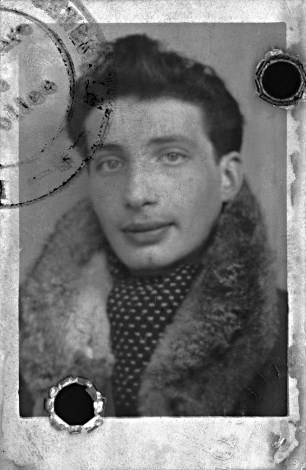
- Boubat in 1943
- Born: 13 September 1923; Montmartre, Paris, France
- Died: 30 June 1999 (aged 75); Paris, France
- Spouses: Lella (m. 1947; div. 1952) Sophie (m. 1954)
- Children: Bernard Boubat
- Website: www.edouard-boubat.fr

Édouard Boubat (French: [buba]; 13 September 1923 – 30 June 1999) was a French photojournalist and art photographer.

== Life and work ==
Boubat was born in Montmartre, Paris. He studied typography and graphic arts at the École Estienne and worked for a printing company before becoming a photographer. In 1943, he was subjected to service du travail obligatoire, forced labour of French people in Nazi Germany, and witnessed some of the horrors of World War II. He took his first photograph after the war in 1946 and was awarded the Kodak Prize the following year. He travelled internationally for the French magazine Réalités, where his colleague was Jean-Philippe Charbonnier, and later worked as a freelance photographer. French poet Jacques Prévert called him a "peace correspondent" as he was humanist, apolitical and photographed uplifting subjects. His son Bernard Boubat is also a photographer.

== Notable awards ==
- 1947 – Kodak Prize
- 1971 – David Octavius Hill Medal
- 1984 – Grand Prix National de la Photographie
- 1988 – Hasselblad Foundation International Award in Photography

== Gallery ==
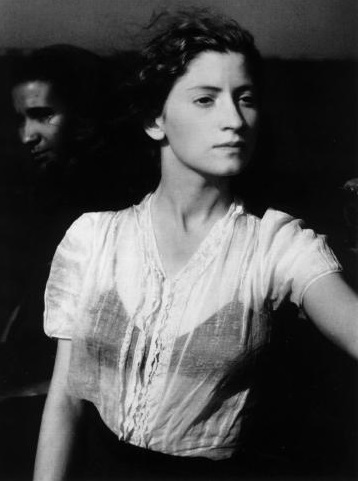
Lella 1947.

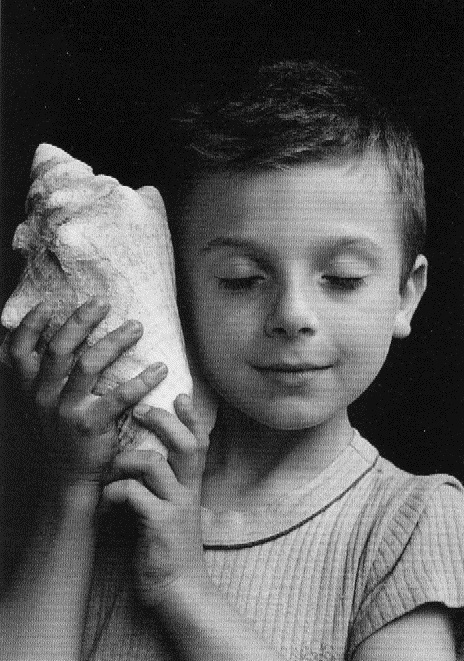
Remi 1995.

== Exhibitions ==
=== Solo ===
- 2 November – 23 December 2006: Les photographes de Réalités: Édouard Boubat, Jean-Philippe Charbonnier, Jean-Louis Swiners. Galerie Agathe Gaillard, Paris, France
- 15 August – 1 October 2006: French masters: Edouard Boubat and Jean-Philippe Charbonnier. Duncan Miller Gallery, Los Angeles, USA
- 1983 Ambassade de France, New York (USA)
- 1982 Lausanne, Switzerland.
  - Witkin Gallery, New York (USA)
- 1980 Musée d'Art Moderne, Paris
  - Lausanne Switzerland
- 1979 Fondation Nationale de la Photographie. Lyon, France.
- 1978 Musée d'Art Moderne Carilo, Mexico
  - Musée N. Niépce, France
  - Chalon s/Saône, France
  - Photographers' Gallery, London, UK
- 1976 Witkin Gallery, New York (USA) and travelling.
- 1975 Galerie du Château d'Eau, Toulouse, France
- 1973 Bibliothèque Nationale, Paris, France
- 1971 India, Galerie Rencontre, Paris
- 1967 Moderna Museet, Stockholm, Sweden
- 22 November – 31 December 1954, Édouard Boubat, Limelight Gallery, New York, USA

=== Group ===
- 1951 Galerie La Hune, Paris, France
- 1949 Salon, Bibliothèque Nationale, Paris, France

== Publications ==
- Edouard Boubat: Pauses (Bookking International, 1988). ISBN 978-2877140249.
- Édouard Boubat (Centre national de la photographie, 1988). ISBN 978-2867540431.
- Photographies 1950–1987. (Éditions du Désastre, 1988). ISBN 978-2877700016.
- It's a Wonderful Life (Editions Assouline, 1997). ISBN 978-2843230127.
- Édouard Boubat: The Monograph. (Harry N. Abrams, Inc., 2004). ISBN 978-0810956100.
- Édouard Boubat: A Gentle Eye (Thames & Hudson, 2004). ISBN 978-0500512012.
