= François Tuefferd =

French photographer (1912–1996)

François Tuefferd (30 May 1912 – 17 December 1996) was a French photographer, active from the 1930s to the 1950s. He also ran a darkroom and gallery in Paris, Le Chasseur d'Images, where he printed and exhibited the works of his contemporaries. His best-known imagery features the French circus.

== Biography ==
Born into a well-to-do family on 30 May 1912 in Montbéliard (Doubs), Tuefferd was encouraged in his early interest in photography by his father, Henri Tuefferd, doctor and capable amateur photographer. His brother, Jean-Pierre, was mayor of Montbéliard from 1959 to 1965.

Tuefferd studied at the Lycée Louis-le-Grand in Paris in 1920. He made his first photographs in 1925 with a Vest Pocket Kodak and on his first trip to Tunisia in 1929. Resident there in 1931 he joined the 4th Zouaves Regiment, and equipped with a Leica and a Spido press camera by L. Gaumont & Cie, he made portraits of soldiers and landscapes of the desert as well as documenting the Tunisian population, hitherto ignored by photographers.

== Career ==
Tuefferd began exhibiting in the salons in the 1930s, including the influential XXXI Salon International D'Art Photographique (Société Française de Photographie) in 1936, which was judged by Laure Albin-Guillot.

On leave, he met George Hoyningen-Huene who lent him his Rolleiflex to take pictures of the shooting of a parody of L'Atlantide by GW Pabst. Impressed by the quality of the photos, Hoyningen-Huene offered him an internship at Vogue studios in Paris in the autumn (Condé Nast SA), where he worked in the studio, darkroom and retouching workshop on advertising and product shots. In March 1932, he left the Vogue studio and entered that of Gaston Grenier. There he set up a specialized facilities for 35 mm processing and very quickly photographers such as Rogi André, Ilse Bing, Robert Capa, Ergy Landau and Man Ray became his clients. He photographed the liner SS Normandie in 1936.

== First Paris gallery dedicated to photography ==
In June 1937, with an inheritance, Tuefferd opened Le Chasseur d'Images gallery at 46 rue du Bac, the first Paris gallery dedicated to photography in which he showed both known and unknown photographers. Emmanuel Sougez was first to exhibit there in June 1937. German photographer Herbert List pinned his prints directly to the wall as it was customary in the photo galleries of the time. Bill Brandt, Max Del, and Ilse Bing, also held solo shows there.

Le Chasseur d'Images also presented the original illustrations of Arts et Métiers Graphiques "Photographie" albums from 1938 to 1939. On January 25, 1938, the gallery held the first salon of the professional photographers association Le Rectangle, which included Pierre Adam, Marcel Arthaud, Serge Boiron, Louis Caillaud, Yvonne Chevalier, André Garban, Sandro Guida, Pierre Jahan, Henri Lacheroy, and René-Leon Servant, whose founder was Sougez, and in 1939 presented the Modernist photography club, Le Noir et Blanc, successor to the Rolleiclub. The gallery could present up to 150 30 × 40 cm prints and photographs were sold for 100 Francs. Shows rarely exceeded two weeks in duration and on opening nights the gallery provided an invaluable rendezvous for photographers. Mobilization for war in September 1939 brought an end to the enterprise.

=== Exhibitions at Chasseur d'Images ===
==== 1937 ====
- 16 June – 5 July: Emmanuel Sougez
- 9 July – 30 July: Herbert List
- 5 October – 20 October: Max Del
- 17–30 November: Sandro Guida
- 2–10 November: Arts et métiers graphiques; original prints from the volume Photographie 1938
- 3–24 December: Alain-M.Duchemin: 100 photos d'ici et d'ailleurs

==== 1938 ====
- 25 January – 10 February: Le Rectangle: first salon. Pierre Adam, Marcel Arthaud, Serge Boiron, Louis Caillaud, Yvonne Chevalier, André Garban, Pierre Jahan, Henri Lacheroy, Gaston Paris, Philippe Pottier, Emmanuel Sougez, Jean Roubier, René Servant
- 27 April – 14 May: Paul Kowaliski
- May: François Tuefferd
- 15–25 June: E. Haack: Un journaliste se promène 130 photos
- 27 June – 14 July: Bill Brandt: London by Night
- 4–15 November: Arts et Métiers Graphiques; Photographies 1939. Original prints from the volume published by Arts et Métiers Graphiques

==== 1939 ====
- 27 March – 15 April Ilse Bing: Impressions de New-York
- 28 April – 15 May Yvonne Chevalier, Pierre Jahan, Philippe Pottier, members of the group Rectangle
- May: François Tuefferd: Photos of Tunisia
- 27 May – 12 June Le Noir et Blanc Exposition annuelle du Club moderne de Photographie, conference on "photography in colour" led by Paul Kowaliski, who had shown in Photography 1839–1937 March 17–April 18, 1937 at MoMA, New York, and who in 1951 would write, with Jean Dourgnon, the seminal La reproduction des couleurs.

In October 1940, he returned to Paris and devoted himself to documenting, in a humanist mode, the world of the circus that visited Paris every year and in which he found a unique subject, a world of its own redolent of Old Paris, and for years photographed trapeze artists seen from below, spotlit against a dark background and gasping spectators craning their necks, as well as behind-the-scenes vignettes of circus performers applying makeup, practicing, eating and training animals. An instance of his empathy for his subjects photographing circuses occurred when a clown was very sick; he took on the role himself for a week during which time he made a self-portrait as a clown.

He was stills photographer for Pathé-Cinéma's Port d'attache and Le Secret de Madame Clapain. For the publisher Prisma, he wrote the practical component of a photography correspondence course and articles for L'Agenda Prisma.

== Postwar in France and Tunisia ==
In 1945, after making documentaries for the tourist commission, Tuefferd went back to Tunisia to shoot documentary films on Ramadan, on the island of Djerba, in Kairouan, and a falcon hunt. Banned in Paris from continuing his professional practice during the Régime de Vichy, he went to New York City to reunite with his artist friends, among them Alexander Calder whom he had met in Tunisia.

In 1946, he helped co-found the influential Le Groupe des XV with René Servant, Marcel Bovis, Lucien Lorelle, Jean Séeberger, and Emmanuel Sougez.

In 1949, he returned to France and resumed his work on the circus

He contributed photography to the journals L'Architecture d'aujourd'hui, Le Courrier des métiers d'art, Métiers de France.

== Life in America ==
In the early 1950s Tuefferd lived for a time in Hudson, NH and photographed in the US, and in 1955 was included by Edward Steichen in the seminal world-touring The Family of Man that commenced at the Museum of Modern Art.

In the midst of a snowstorm on Mt Cardigan, NH, in 1968 met his wife-to-be Helen (née McDougall, 17 February 1932 – 30 April 2016) who was a member of the Appalachian Mountain Club, participating in White Mountain hikes. Though for a time he relinquished photography to work in electronics in the United States he resumed again in 1992.

He died on December 17, 1996, and was survived by his wife Helen, and his two sons, Max and Nanook.

The Musée National des Arts et Traditions posthumously showed his circus imagery in an exhibit in 1999 entitled François Tuefferd: "Le cirque", photographs 1933-1954. A catalogue of his circus work was published by la Réunion des Musées Nationaux.

== Collections ==
- Bibliothèque nationale de France

== Exhibitions ==
- 1998, Musée national des Arts et Traditions Populaires
- 2002, Bibliothèque historique de la ville de Paris, Regard sur le cirque, 11 June - 15 September
- 2007, Bibliothèque nationale de France
- 2008, BDIC (collective)

== Bibliography ==
- 1945-1968 La photographie humaniste. Bibliothèque Nationale de France with the direction of Laure Beaumont-Maillet, Françoise Denoyelle and Dominique Versavel.
- François Tuefferd: Le Cirque .... RMN, 1999. ISBN 2-7118-3661-4.
- Une histoire de la photographie. M.+M.Auer.
- La Nouvelle Photographie en France 1919-1939. By Christian Bouqueret in collaboration with Tuefferd.
- François Tuefferd, Chasseur d'Images. By Thomas Michael Gunther. Paris Bibliothèques, 1993.
- Le Cirque de François Tuefferd Photographies de 1933 à 1954. Musée National des Arts et Traditions Populaires, Réunion des Musées Nationaux, 1998. ISBN 978-2-7118-3661-1.
- La Merveilleuse Histoire du Cirque. By Henry Thétard. Prisma, 1947.
