= Le Rectangle =

Advertising association (1937-1946)

Le Rectangle was a professional association of French illustration and advertising photographers created in 1937 and disbanded in 1946 to be replaced by Le Groupe des XV.

== Context ==
In the first half of the twentieth century France, after Germany, was a major publisher of picture magazines, including Paris-Soir, Le Monde-Illustré, Art et Décoration, Art et Médecine, l’Illustration, La Gazette, Le Jardin des Modes, Candide, Gringoire, Détective, Voilà, Marianne, Faits Divers, Sourire, Photo-Monde, Regards, Ce Soir, Vu, Partout-Paris, Paris-Magazine, Paris Sex-Appeal and Paris Match.

Aside from the few salaried staff photographers, an array of photo-agences national and international, and representing many hundreds of freelance photojournalists and photographers, supplied the imagery; Agence ROL, Trampus, Harlingue, Meurisse, Service General de la Presse, Alban, Achay, Buffotot, Mondial Photo Presse, Vereenidge Fotobureaux, Foto Bureau, Giraudon, Stella Presse, Agence France-Presse, Arax, Chevjolon, Actualites Photos, Press-Cliche, Compagnie Aerienne Francaise, Centropress, Ecce Photo, Aral, Dephot, Les Illustres Francais, Photothek, Interphotos, Bulgur, Rapho, Schostal, etc., among them.

On the eve of World War II however, the dominance of photography in the French press slowed and had once again to compete for publication against drawn illustration.

At l'Exposition internationale des arts et des techniques dans la vie moderne, under the Eiffel Tower in 1937, for the first time a panel (Groupe XIV) was formed to display advertising, including the work of photographers, of which its president Léon Rénier, of l’Agence Havas proclaimed;

"Animator of modern life, generator of progress. Advertising cannot be separated from the activity of our time with the rhythm of which it is closely associated. It uses producers of all kinds to manifest itself. Artists, craftsmen, workers, work for it in large numbers, without counting those who, in the industries it animates and develops, live indirectly from its action."

== Foundation ==
French photographers were quick to react, led by Emmanuel Sougez, who after extensive artistic training at the École des Beaux-Arts in Bordeaux, with experience in Switzerland and across Europe, had been directing the photographic department of the prestigious magazine l’Illustration since 1926. In 1937 he founded Le Rectangle to defend the trade against amateurism exemplified in offerings at the great exhibitions of 1936 and 1937, with consequent diminishing public respect, recognising that, in this development, the “country of Niépce,” was most at fault;

“While other nations bestowed on it confidence and credit, in France, which is nevertheless the country of Niépce, photography has been ridiculed for too long by who knows what absurd judgments. The professional photographer (…), even now in certain circles, is considered a grotesque being, a pretentious failure”. So much so that the favour which Niépce’s invention enjoys today “comes from elsewhere,” from these “Germans and their neighbours in Central Europe now held to be the best photographers in the world”, who “invaded France, suffocating our poor colleagues”.

== Members ==
The founding members in 1937 were photographers based then in Paris;

1. Pierre Adam (at 26, rue des Plantes)
2. Marcel Arthaud (14, rue Alfred-Roll)
3. Serge Boiron (1901-1975), "MOF (Meilleurs Ouvrier de France, photograph and hart), he had a studio 16, rue Duphot Paris and settled few times before the war in Lyon, where he works for the Lumiere factory and had his own studio. He has been a member of the French resistance.He died in Lyon O7, Avenue Berthelot. He made a lot of photos for industrial expositions and factories.
4. Louis Caillaud (I, rue Claude-Matrat, Issy-les-Moulineaux)
5. Yvonne Chevalier (117, boulevard Jourdan) (the only woman)
6. André Garban (50, rue des Martyrs)
7. Pierre Jahan (14, rue Lafontaine)
8. Henri Lacheroy (64, rue Saint-Charles)
9. Gaston Paris (27, boulevard des Italiens)
10. Philippe Pottier (55, rue de Verneuil)
11. Jean Roubier (68, rue Boursault),
12. Emmanuel Sougez (9, rue Bourdaloue)
13. René Servant (29, rue Condé)

== Ethos ==
Sougez explained the origin of the name of the group in June 1938, a year after its birth, in an article in Photo-Illustrations:

"A few isolated people meet around the same ideas, a common love of their profession. And a group is formed: three, five, ten, thirteen... Here is Le Rectangle. This name, suggested by Pierre Adam during the initial discussions, was adopted for its regularity and harmony, as well as its rigor and discipline. Because the Rectangle is subject to strict laws".

He continued to explain that this "Association of French Illustration and Advertising Photographers" was to be an affirmation of the profession, bringing together "irreproachable technicians," because "photography is a complex and delicate profession, which requires knowledge and long experience [which] could only be practiced honourably after years of practice, with the help of qualities, some of which are innate, precise equipment and a thorough knowledge of its subsequent applications."

A preliminary manifesto, published in 1938 for its first Salon, defined the new association:

"A group of notable practitioners, organised to ensure, at the same time as first-class productions, the defence and dissemination of photography. Determined to exercise this defense through the quality of its work, Le Rectangle offers, through the choice of its members and the rigour of its conduct, serious assurance. A program based on such motives offers high guarantees. It opens up new paths to those who hesitate, or are still unaware of the virtues of photography. Le Rectangle brings together, in a sought-after eclecticism, the best professional elements of French photography in all its branches and applications. Driven by a rare fraternal solidarity, this group of yet independent units presents itself as a coherent block within which meetings and demonstrations provoke a continuous renewal of the spirit of creation. This new organisation forestalls exploitation by amateur photographers."

Le Rectangle thus evinced a degree of professional and nationalist chauvinism in its claim to promote "the best elements of French photography".

In his article for Photo-Illustrations, whose headquarters at rue Saint-Jacques served temporarily as that of the new association, Sougez noted that a "rare brotherly solidarity" unites the members of the association. Meetings were held with a dinner at the homes of members in turn with business, according to Pierre Jahan, in the same article, being "what interested us, photography,” but excluded operational issues of individual members, copyright for example, which they dealt with themselves.

== Exhibitions and critical reception ==
The group showed together in the 1937 Exposition Internationale, Galerie d'Art et Industrie, in Paris, but the "First Salon" of the Rectangle, a show of 150 images by all thirteen members, was inaugurated on January 25, 1938, in the gallery of François Tuefferd, his 'Chasseur d'images', until 10 February. Members were predominantly practitioners of a modernist New Vision style. Georges Besson, author of a history of photography, sees in examples "par excellence" in this exhibition "the triumph of technique in the service of taste over successes and games of chance (...), a return of French photography to the simplicity and loyalty of its origins perpetuated by Nadar" In Beaux-Arts, Renée Moutard-Uldry praised its “irreproachable technicians, intelligent artists and of sure taste [who] have understood that it was necessary to take stock after the unreasonable ordeal of the [National] Exhibition" They also showed in the 1938 Salon International de la Photo, Paris, and exhibited in the 1942 Exposition Nationale Artisanale, Paris.

== War years ==
Mobilization in 1939 largely suspended the group's activities, which resumed in 1941. Sougez, still head of the photographic department of L'Illustration during the Occupation, was asked by the Vichy government to produce a portrait of Philippe Pétain. Many of the members of the Rectangle contribute to Destins de l'intelligence française, a publication legitimizing the Vichy regime or, like Gaston Paris worked as a freelancer for the magazine La Semaine, directly controlled by the Vichy authorities.

Headquarters in 1941 moved to the Société Française de Photographie, 51, rue de Clichy, and membership altered too, with Marcel Bovis admitted on June 14, 1941, Serge Boiron in his absence was replaced in his duties as treasurer by René Servant and Tuefferd joined the group. Marcel Arthaud took the initiative in this period of war to create "a small mutual aid service to help out comrades, momentarily short of a product or an essential equipment". Pierre Jahan solicited his comrades for the Artisanal Exhibition of the Ministry of Production, for which he has the mission of organizing the participation of photographers.

== Demise ==
In August 1944, Paris was liberated, but for some, Louis Caillaud, Rémy Duval, André Vigneau, and René Zuber, their career had come to an end, while the photographic profession itself took some time to return to full activity. In 1944, the association, seeking to revive itself at its General Assembly of December 16, and in an attempt to bring together more professional illustrative photographers, it was decided to recruit Laure Albin Guillot, Gilbert Boisgontier, Pierre Boucher, Robert Doisneau, Daniel Masclet, Fernande Papillon, Roger Parry, Roger Schall, Jean Séeberger, René Zuber and François Vals, but to no avail.

The group was politically centrist and unattractive to those of the left, like Kertesz, Capa and Seymour. Schall, Vals, and Papillon were accredited by the Vichy to cover official events. Furthermore, and of negative impact during the épurations legale, as Françoise Denoyelle notes "many photographers, founders or members of the Rectangle group, practiced during the war. Their biography is singularly silent about this period," in contrast to the Keystone agency, led by Hungarian Jews the Garai brothers, which pursued quality work in the service of the Resistance and allies.

Despite a new board being formed with Arthaud made president, Sougez as honorary president, Roubier vice-president, Jahan general secretary and Pottier, treasurer, Le Rectangle proved moribund.

== Successor ==
Through an enthusiastic younger generation in 1946, the Groupe des XV was formed to include Marcel Bovis, Yvonne Chevalier, Henri Lacheroy, Philippe Pottier, René Jacques, Emmanuel Sougez and François Tuefferd from Le Rectangle, joined by Marcel Amson and Lucien Lorelle, Jean-Marie Auradon, Jean Michaud and Jean Séeberger, Daniel Masclet, Robert Doisneau, Willy Ronis, Pierre Jahan, Marcel Ichac and Thérèse le Prat, before the resignations of Tuefferd and Chevalier. Internal rules were drawn up based on those of Le Rectangle with admissions also made on the proposal of the members of the group, not on official candidacy, and decided by secret ballot, and like its predecessor it was a collegial circle; "each member," wrote Garban, 'formally undertakes to respect the spirit of loyalty and frankness which is the very basis of the group' On November 8, 1946, Julien Cain, general administrator, inaugurated the first National Salon of Photography at the National Library, in the Mansart gallery.
