= Frères Séeberger =

French fashion photographer family

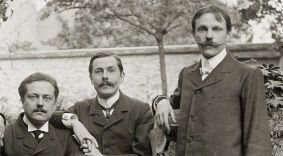
Group portrait of Henri, Jules et Louis Séeberger, about 1900* © Séeberger frères

The Séeberger family, known as the Frères Séeberger; three brothers Jules (1872–1932), Henri (1876–1956) and Louis' (1874-1946), sons Jean (1910–1979) and Albert (1914–1999) were a French fashion photography family active during the 20th century.

== Background ==
Fashion photography began with engravings reproduced from photographs of Leopold-Emile Reutlinger, Nadar and others in the 1890s. After high-quality half-tone reproduction of photographs became possible, most credit as pioneers of the genre goes to the French Baron Adolph de Meyer and the Luxembourgian Edward Steichen who, borrowing his friend’s hand-camera in 1907, candidly photographed dazzlingly-dressed ladies at the Longchamp Racecourse and who by 1911 had been assigned by the French magazine Art et Décoration to produce pictures of dresses by the Parisian designer Paul Poiret, competing with the drawings and pochoir prints earlier, and contemporaneously, used for fashion plates.

== The Séebergers ==
A family devoted to the genre was the Séeberger dynasty over two generations. Three brothers Jules (1872–1932), Louis (1874-1946) and Henri (1876-1956) were born to Jean-Baptiste, a Bavarian tradesman who had migrated to France in 1870, and their mother Louise, a widow from Lyon with a daughter Félicie. The second generation, sons of Louis, brothers Jean (1910-1979) and Albert (1914-1999) also inherited a love of photography. Together, their work spans most of the twentieth century and was devoted to elegance and fashion.

The brothers went to Paris for secondary education at the Lycée Rollin where Louis was awarded first prize for drawing. They completed their schooling at the municipal art school Palissy, before Jules and Louis start their training as designers of fabric at the atelier of J. Souchon, a specialist in “high innovations, gowns, ribbons, damask linens, Jacqaurd fabrics and drafting.” From thence came an interest, and much inside knowledge of, fashion.

While the three brothers worked as fabric designers, it was in 1891 that Jules started in evening drawing classes and also picked up photography. After a move to 39 rue Lafayette in the 10th Arr., Louis won the Danton Jeune prize dedicated to a disadvantaged child at the Ville de Paris art school, while Jules won a travel grant to Normandy. In the meantime, the youngest, Henri, enrolled at a school for applied art and also won prizes. After the death of their father in 1894 the family moved to the quieter 13 rue Fénelon.

In 1899 Jules submitted photographs to various contests, an interest soon shared by his brothers, winning prizes in amateur competitions organised by the newspaper Lectures Pour Tous. He experimented with bromoil, especially the Rawlins process. Jules took documentary photography awards in 1903 and 1904 for pictures he made on the Seine riverbanks and in Montmartre. Images by the three brothers, who signed their initials (JHLS) were exhibited and published in various journals and as postcards by the Kunzli brothers and Leopold Verger.

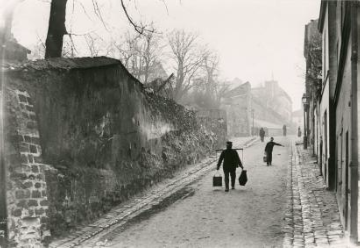
Kunzli Bros. and Co., (c.1901) Zurich Gruss aus St. Moritz (Greetings from St. Moritz), Postcard No. 3587. Jules Séeberger (1898) The Montmartre Water Carrier

Supported by their mother, their older sister and Louis’ wife Anna, the three brothers established a family business in 1909 under the name 'Frères Séeberger' in a studio at 33 rue de Chabrol, also in the 10th and five minutes walk from their home.

== Fashion photographers ==
While magazines like Les Modes published careful portraits, most hand-coloured, of high society women in outfits designed by the renowned couturiers, the daily newspapers like Le Figaro and Le Gaulois had been running pictures in their late editions taken, like Steichen’s, of women at the racetracks, and their approach was taken up by the magazine Femina, in an effort to satisfy the curiosity among their readership about what was fashionable in ‘real clothing’, a trend soon picked up by Paris Illustré or La Nouvelle Mode that from 1901-1902 featured snapshots taken by obscure amateurs Carle de Mazibourg or Edmond Cordonnier, though these were soon displaced by more professional images.

The brothers followed the in-crowd calendar as they went to beach resorts, ski resorts, and other fashionable locations in Paris. Their quarry was photographs of lady’s fashion (and some men’s too). They sent a series of photographs of fashionable women at race tracks to Caroline de Broutelles. She published them in the magazine she founded, La Mode Pratique and the brothers would continue to be published there from May 22, 1909 onwards.

Their focus was on dresses, shoes, bags, hats, furs, and feathers, and haute couture.

From their imagery, since it was published immediately in a long list of over 50 publications, fashion historians are able to track the influence on style of the great designers Chanel, Paul Poiret, Jeanne Lanvin, Elsa Schiaparelli, Jean Patou, Robert Piguet, Madeleine Vionnet, Lucien Lelong, Paquin et al., of whom the Séebergers also made portraits.

Not all of their subjects were of the higher classes. The great houses of Poiret, Lanvin, Worth or Patou hired models for their slim figures and tutored poses who would troop together ready to be seen and photographed. Lesser, or newer, couturiers hired casuals by the hour and often dressed them in their most eccentric costumes to attract attention, while some wore the insignia of the designers on their backs like sandwich-board bearers while they circulated alone. Milliners did not shy from wearing their own creations. The ‘fashionables’ were another class of model; well-known personalities known as ‘amphibians’, ‘jockeys’ or ‘society consultants’ who, while their celebrity lasted, wore the great designers latest creations sold to them at huge discounts or loaned free.

== Style and technique ==
The Séeberger brothers' fashion photography required familiarity with their models, awareness of current fashion trends, and the selection of suitable subjects from crowds at fashionable race meetings. Until around 1935, when Henri adopted the Rolleiflex, they used larger cameras, including the folding Ernemann Klapp Nettel and the Thornton-Pickard 13 × 18 cm reflex camera, at locations such as the Bois de Boulogne and St. Moritz. Henri worked alongside his brother Louis, who directed the models, recorded details of their clothing in a notebook, and handled the dark slides used in photography. Despite the limitations of their equipment, their photographs from as early as 1911 conveyed an appearance of immediacy and spontaneity, aided by their use of professional models.

== The French image ==
In addition the brothers’ fashion imagery overlapped with their portrayal of media celebrities including Joséphine Baker and Charlie Chaplin. A lesser known part of their practice, as noted by Gilbert Salachas, from 1923 International Kinema Research employed the Séeberger brothers to document locations which filmmakers adapted to create the formulaic Parisian ‘atmosphere’ in sets for movies such as the 1938 American romantic comedy Bluebeard’s Eighth Wife and A comedy of murders (Charles Chaplin, 1947) or even as late as An American in Paris (Vincente Minnelli, 1951), thus creating a mythic Paris that survives in cinema even today.

== The second generation ==
The death of Julius in 1932 and then the declaration of war mark the final withdrawal of Louis and Henry from the family business, and a brief closure during the war mobilization of the next generation of Séebergers, Jean and Albert, Louis’ two sons who retained the name “Séeberger brothers” until closure in 1977. They were assisted by Jean’s wife Suzanne (as secretary) then successively by Albert’s wife Cecile (in editing), Jean’s son Daniel (as assistant), and various collaborators.

After WW2 the brothers continued with fashion photography as their specialty, alongside some industrial commissions, but with increasing studio work with paid fashion models at a new premises 112 boulevard Malesherbes (in the 17th Arr.). While not in the vanguard, they digested the style of the Le Groupe des XV, typified in the work of Philippe Pottier, Pierre Jahan, René-Jacques, and Lucien Lorelle.

The family loyalty and devotion to photography endured across two busy generations; when Jean died in 1979, Albert wrote:

“I can not say enough how much I admired the one with whom I have worked for almost half a century.”

— Dars Célestine, A fashion parade : the Seeberger Collection

== Major exhibitions ==
- 1976 : Paris, la rue, Bibliothèque historique de la ville de Paris
- 1979-1980 : Les parisiens au fil des jours (1900-1960). Photographies Séeberger frères, Bibliothèque Historique de la Ville de Paris
- 1980 : Paris 1950 photographié par le Groupe des XV, Hôtel Lamoignon, Bibliothèque Historique de la Ville de Paris
- 1982 : Exposition de photographies des frères Séeberger, MJC, Ribérac
- 1992 : Les Séeberger - L'aventure de trois frères photographes au début du siècle, Centre Photographique d’Île-de-France, Pontault-Combault
- 1994 : L'Occupation et la Libération de Paris par Jean Séeberger photographe, Centre culturel et bibliothèque municipale de Ribérac-en-Périgord
- 1995 : 1910, Paris inondé, Direction du Patrimoine, Paris
- 1995 : Le Paris d'Hollywood, sur un air de réalité, Caisse nationale des monuments historiques et des sites, Paris
- 1999 : Les frères Séeberger - Une lignée de photographes, Château des Bouillants, Dammarie-les-Lys
- 2002 : Séeberger, des photographes dans le siècle, Ancienne synagogue de la Ferté-sous-Jouare
- 2006 : Les Séeberger - Photographes de l'élégance 1909-1939, Bibliothèque nationale de France, Galerie de la Photographie, 58 rue de Richelieu, Paris
- 2007 : Collections années 50. Photographies Séeberger frères et Georges Dambier, Collégiale Notre-Dame, Ribérac
- 2010 : Le Deauville des Séeberger, Festival Planche(s), Deauville
- 2023 : Etretat seen by the Séeberger Brothers

== Collections ==
- Bibliothèque nationale de France
- Centre des monuments nationaux, Département des ressources documentaires
- Château-musée de Gien : Chasse, histoire et nature en Val de Loire
- Médiathèque du patrimoine
- ECPAD
- Bibliothèque nationales de France
- Bibliothèque-musée de l'Opéra
- Bibliothèque historique de la Ville de Paris
- Musée Carnavalet
- Centre Georges Pompidou
- Musée français de la photographie (Bièvres)
- Association Gaston Litaize
- Palais Galliera - Musée de la Mode de la Ville de Paris

== Gallery ==
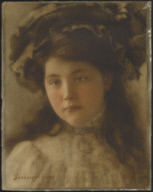
Portrait of a young girl, c. 1909

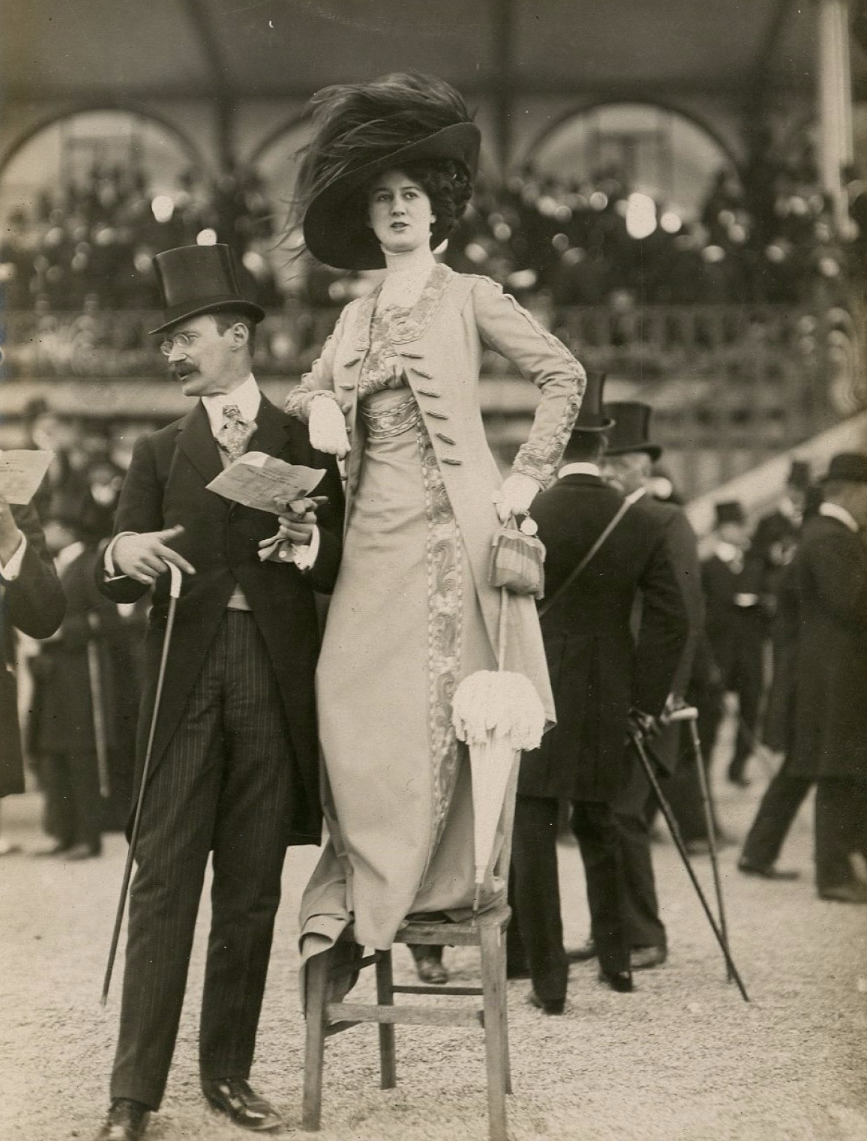
Elegance at the racecourse, 1909–1939

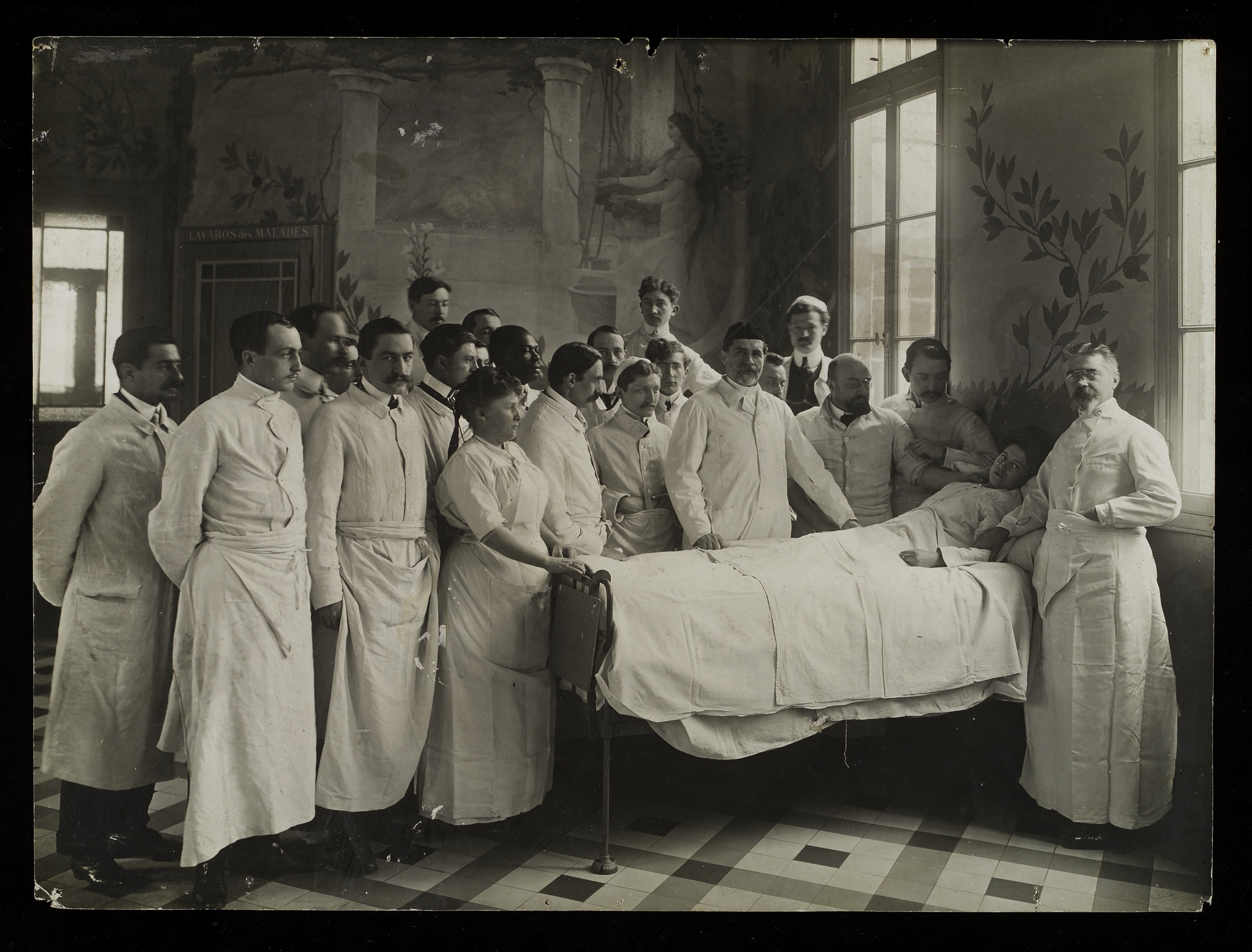
Medical staff and a female patient, c.1910

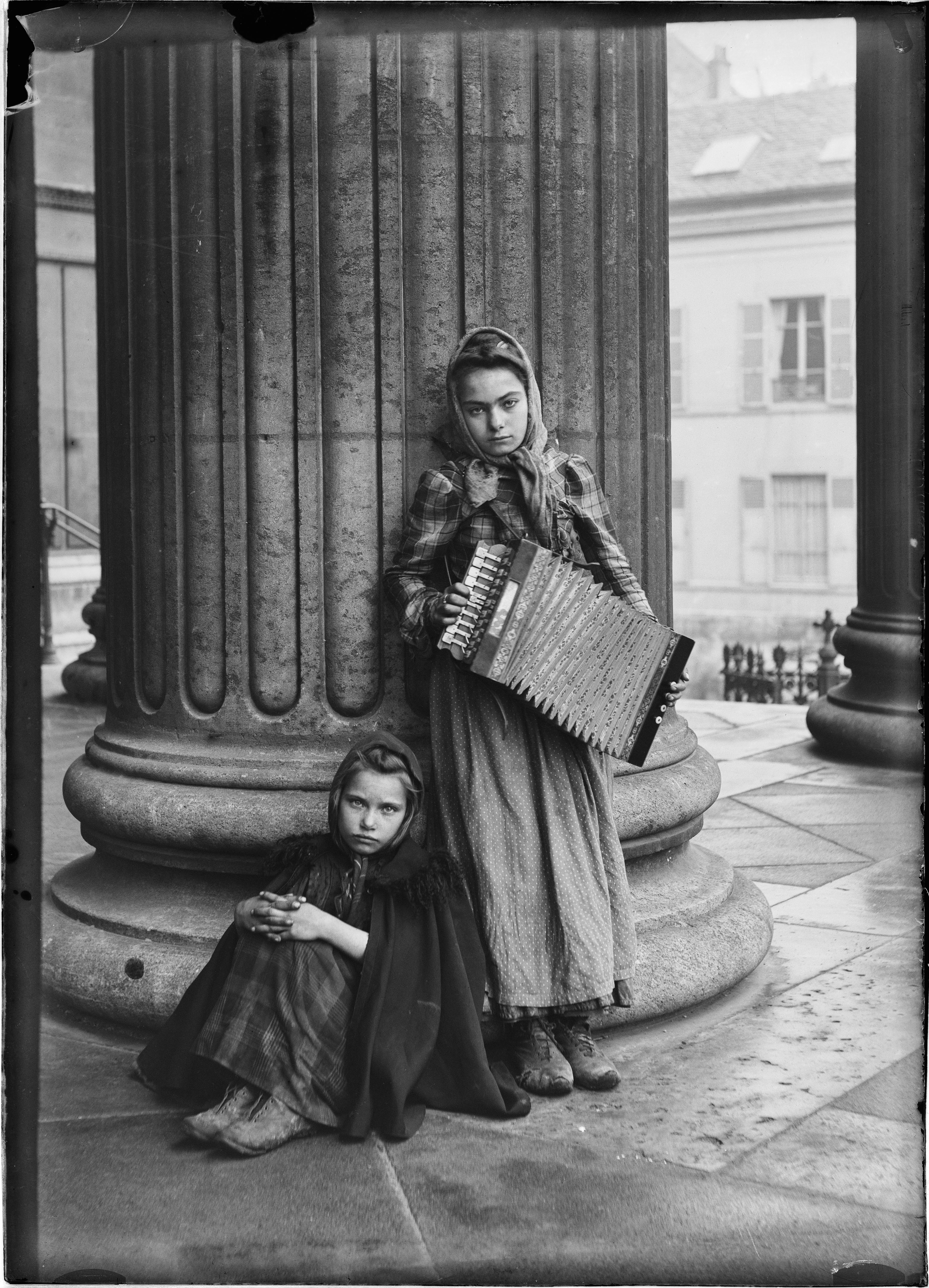
Young street musicians, 1910–1929

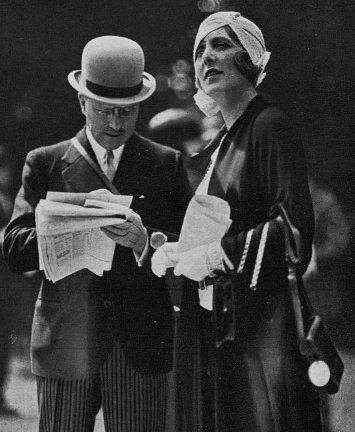
André Citroën and Baroness Édouard de Rothschild at the great hurdle race (Les Modes), 1930

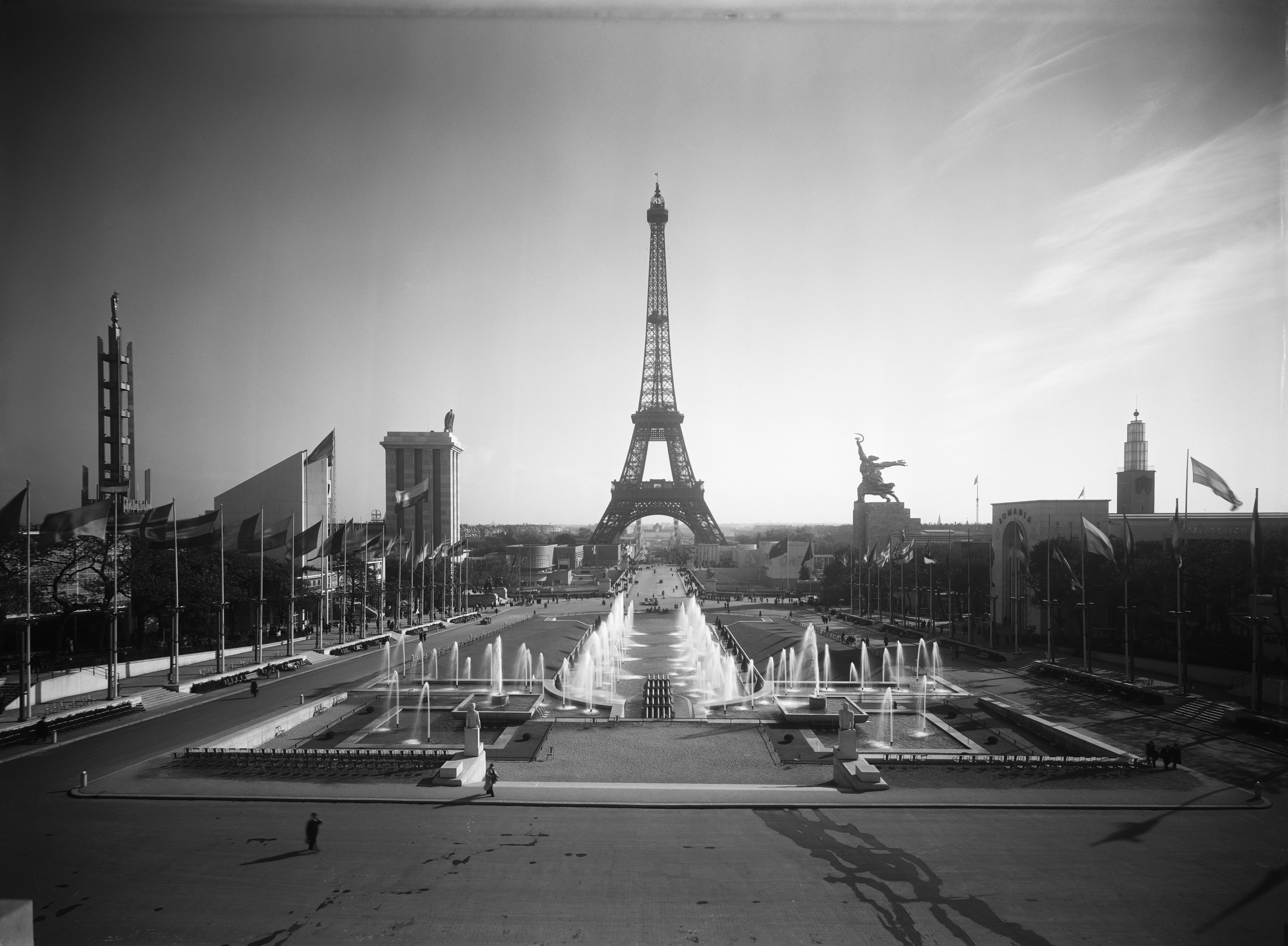
The Jardins du Trocadéro with the Nazi German pavilion (left), the Soviet pavilion (right) and Eiffel Tower in the background for the International Exposition of Art and Technology in Modern Life, 1937

== Bibliography ==
The catalogue of an exhibition of the Séeberger frères held June 27—September 2006 in the Richelieu photography gallery at the la Bibliothèque nationale de France, Sylvie Aubenas‘ and Xavier Demange‘s Elegance : the Seeberger brothers and the birth of fashion photography, is the most authoritative representation of their fashion imagery and the fashions it documents. Other useful books and websites include:

- Bibliothèque Historique de la Ville de Paris, Les parisiens au fil des jours (1900-1960). Séeberger frères, Paris, Bibliothèque Historique de la Ville de Paris, 1980
- Les Séeberger. Photographes de l'élégance. 1909-1939, sous la direction de Sylvie Aubenas et Xavier Demange, Paris, Bibliothèque nationale de France, du 27 juin au 3 septembre 2006, Seuil/Bibliothèque nationale de France, 2006
- Catalogue of exhibition Collections années 50. Photographies Séeberger frères et Georges Dambier, Ribérac, Collégiale Notre-Dame, du 5 juillet au 2 septembre 2007
- Séeberger frères (1930s) Ski resort illustrations for Échoes de l’Air, bulletin of Air France, gallica.bnf.fr
- SÉEBERGER Frères. L’élégance des regards, catalogue de vente de la maison Millon, 8 novembre 2016
- Virginie Chardin, Séeberger frères, Actes Sud, collection Photo Poche, 2006
- Lucien Curzi, « Écrire avec la lumière », Saisons, n°12, automne 1997, pp. 32–36
- Dars, Célestine (1979), A fashion parade : the Seeberger Collection, Blond & Briggs, ISBN 978-0-85634-061-1
- Eddy Dubois, Images de chasses, Grenoble, Arthaud, 1972
- Jean-Claude Gautrand, Les Séeberger, l'aventure de trois frères photographes au début du siècle, Paris, La Manufacture, Collection « Les poches du patrimoine photographique », 1992
- Thomas Michael Gunther, Isabelle-Cécile Le Mée, Hervé Degand, Catherine Tambrum, Regards sur la Libération de Paris. Photographies, août 1944. Marcel-Arthaud, André Bienvenu, Robert Capa, Henri Cartier-Bresson, Robert Cohen, Robert Doisneau, André Gandner, Pierre Jahan, gaston Paris, Robert Parry, Jean Roubier, Pierre Roughol, Serge de Sazo, Séeberger frères, René Zuber, Paris, Monum éditions du patrimoine, 2004
- Maureen Huault, La seconde génération Séeberger : Jean et Albert (1940-1977), study paper of the Ecole du Louvre presented under the supervision of Mme Dominique de Font-Réaulx, Paris, 2014
- Maureen Huault, Chroniques de la fugacité. Jean et Albert Séeberger deux photographes de mode au cours des 'Trente Glorieuses' (1940-1977), a research paper on the history of art applied to the collections of the École du Louvre, under the supervision of Mme Dominique de Font-Réaulx and Michel Poivert, Paris, 2015
- Maureen Huault, « La valorisation du fonds photographique des frères Séeberger (1906- 1977) au Centre des monuments historiques », Monumental, Revue scientifique et technique des monuments historiques, n°1, premier semestre 2015, pp. 112–113
- Maureen Huault, « Les hommes passent, les images restent : la donation Séeberger au Centre des monuments nationaux », L’œil de la photographie, 24 mai 2017
- Séeberger, Henri; Juin, Hubert; Séeberger, Jules, 1872-1932; Séeberger, Louis, 1874-1956 (1979), La France 1900 vue par les frères Seeberger, P. Belfond, ISBN 978-2-7144-1249-2
- Séeberger, Jules; Malécot, Claude; Séeberger, Henri, 1876-1947; Séeberger, Louis, 1874-1956 (2004), Jardins parisiens à la Belle Epoque, Monum, Editions du patrimoine, ISBN 978-2-85822-784-6
- Meriel McCooey, « Watching the girls go by », Sunday Times Magazine, April 6, 1975
- Elise Pailloncy, Carole Peyrot, Marion Poussier, Yann Revol, Inventaire des photographies des frères Séeberger pendant la période de la Seconde Guerre mondiale, mémoire de l'ENS Louis Lumière, Cours de Mme Denoyelle, septembre 2001
- Gilbert Salachas, Le Paris d'Hollywood. Sur un air de réalité. Besançon, Caisse nationale des Monuments Historiques, 1994
- Albert Séeberger, « Au foyer de la M.J.C., l'exposition de photographies des frères Séeberger », L'écho du ribéracois, juillet 1982
- Dominique Versavel, Maureen Huault, Muriel Berthou-Crestey, « Archives. Mode, les collections de la Bibliothèque nationale de France », Bad to the Bone, n°6, 2015, pp. 64–73
