= Herbert List =

German photographer (1903–1975)

Herbert List (7 October 1903 – 4 April 1975) was a German photographer, who worked for magazines, including Vogue, Harper's Bazaar, and Life, and was associated with Magnum Photos. His austere, classically posed black-and-white compositions, particularly his homoerotic male nudes, taken in Italy and Greece being influential in modern photography and contemporary fashion photography.

== Early life ==
Herbert List was born on 7 October 1903 to a prosperous business family in Hamburg, the son of Luise and Felix List. He attended the Johanneum Gymnasium, and afterwards studied literature 1921–23 at the University of Heidelberg. While still a student he became apprenticed in the family company, Landfried Coffee. In 1923, after two years in Heidelberg learning about the coffee trade and attending lectures at the university on Greek art and literature, List traveled for the family business Kaffee-Import Firma List & Heineken, Hamburg. Between 1925 and 1928 he visited plantations and contacts in Guatemala, Costa Rica, San Salvador, Brazil (where he stayed for six months) and San Francisco. During this time he began taking photographs.

== Photographer ==
In 1929 he met Andreas Feininger who inspired his greater interest in photography and gave him a Rolleiflex camera. From 1930 he began taking portraits of friends and shooting still life; was influenced by the Bauhaus and artists of the surrealist movements, Man Ray, Giorgio De Chirico and Max Ernst; and created a surrealist photograph titled Metaphysique in a style he called fotografia metafisica in homage to De Chirico, his most important influence during this period.

List used male models, draped fabric, masks and double-exposures to depict dream states and fantastic imagery. He has explained that his photos were "composed visions where [my] arrangements try to capture the magical essence inhabiting and animating the world of appearances."

While there are surface similarities to Nazi imagery of the athletic male body—that of Leni Riefenstahl for example—unlike them, List's pictures of friends are portraits as much as they are nudes, nor did List endorse Nazi ideas, nor did his work influence National Socialist photography. He never published his male nudes in his own lifetime, and kept them hidden in his mother's house in a sack he called his 'poison bag'. He was however influenced in his depiction of romantic paganism by the Jugendbewegung youth and physical health movement, though he did not join any of its associations, and some of the ideals of the Jugendbewegung were co-opted by the Nazis (though they later denounced the movement) and influenced their idealising Romantic realism. List in his own notes uses a pun—"Das Objektiv ist nicht objectiv,"—to emphasise his creative, non-realist, application of photography: "The lens is not objective. Otherwise photography would be useless as an artistic medium."

In 1936, in response to the danger of Gestapo attention to his openly gay lifestyle and his Jewish heritage, List left Germany for Paris, where he met George Hoyningen-Huene with whom he travelled to Greece, deciding then to become a photographer. During 1937 he worked in a studio in London and held his first one-man show at Galerie du Chasseur d'Images in Paris in a show reviewed by G. Brunon Guardia for l'Intransigeant;

This photographer, having perfected a method based on the geometric laws of composition and the interplay of contrasts, applies to it all a Germanic rigour. The choice of his subjects, the pose of the model, the placement of the object, deliberately artificial, contribute to the coldness of the results. But we are in front of work that is a superb demonstration. The staging is always remarkable in itself except for the facile Hoffmannesque use of wax dolls and masks, but this distant monument which is really part of a bicycle placed in the foreground, or these shells taken at point-blank range on sand in front of a mirror that reflects the dunes, are worth stopping for. Even in the less commendable equivocation of certain nudes, Herbert List shows himself to be an ingenious director, and a faithful interpreter. There is therefore, for gifted amateurs and for many professionals, much to draw from these excellent lessons, even if it means returning later to more soulful expressions.

Hoyningen-Huene referred him to Harper's Bazaar magazine, and 1936–39 he worked for Arts et Metiers Graphiques, Verve, Vogue, Photographie, Life and lesser publications including La Belle France. List was unsatisfied with fashion photography. He turned back to still life imagery, continuing in his fotografia metafisica style.

From 1937 to 1939 List traveled in Greece and took photographs of ancient temples, ruins, sculptures, and the landscape for his book Licht über Hellas. In the meantime he supported himself with work for magazines Neue Linie, Die Dame and for the press from 1940 to 1943, and with portraits which he continued to make until 1950. In List's work the revolutionary tactics of surrealist art and a metaphysical staging of irony and reverie had been honed in on the fashion industry that relied on illusion and spectacle which after World War II returned to a classical fixation on ruins, broken male statuary and antiquity.

== War years ==
In 1941, during World War II, he was forced to return to Germany; but because one of his grandparents was Jewish he was not allowed to publish or work professionally. In 1944 he was drafted into the German military, despite being of partly Jewish ancestry. He served in Norway as a map designer. A trip to Paris allowed him to take portraits of Picasso, Jean Cocteau, Christian Bérard, Georges Braque, Jean Arp, Joan Miró, and others.

== Photojournalism ==
After the war, he photographed the ruins of Munich where he continued to live until 1960, working mainly for the Swiss magazine Du, with freelance photo essays for Heute, Epoca, Look, Harper's Bazaar, Flair, and Picture Post. He was made art editor of Heute magazine, published by the Allied occupying forces, in 1948.

In 1951, List met Robert Capa, who invited him to work as a contributor to Magnum, but he rarely accepted assignments. For the next decade he produced copious work in Italy. During this time he also started using a 35 mm film camera and a telephoto lens. He was influenced by his Magnum colleague Henri Cartier-Bresson as well as the Italian neorealist film movement. In the 1950s he also shot portraits of Marino Marini, Paul Bowles, W. H. Auden, and Marlene Dietrich in 1960. Over the period 1949–62 he visited Italy, Greece, Spain, France, Mexico, and the Caribbean.

List's 1950 picture of a woman, her black dress spread about her, reclining at a respectable distance from an elderly man reading, with one leg of his trousers rolled above his socks and garter, both enjoying the spring sunshine on the front steps of the Glyptothek in Munich, was selected by curator Edward Steichen for the world-touring Museum of Modern Art exhibition The Family of Man, seen by 9 million visitors.

== Recognition and legacy ==
In 1964 List was awarded the David Octavius Hill Prize of the Gesellschaft Deutscher Lichtbildner.

List is best known for his book Junge Männer (1988) which contains more than seventy images of young men lounging in the sun, wrestling and innocently regarding the camera lens. It is introduced by Stephen Spender in whose autobiographical novel The Temple, written in 1929 but not published until 1988, List is fictionalised as Joachim Lenz.

List gave up photography in the early 1960s to concentrate on his collection of Italian Old Master Drawings.

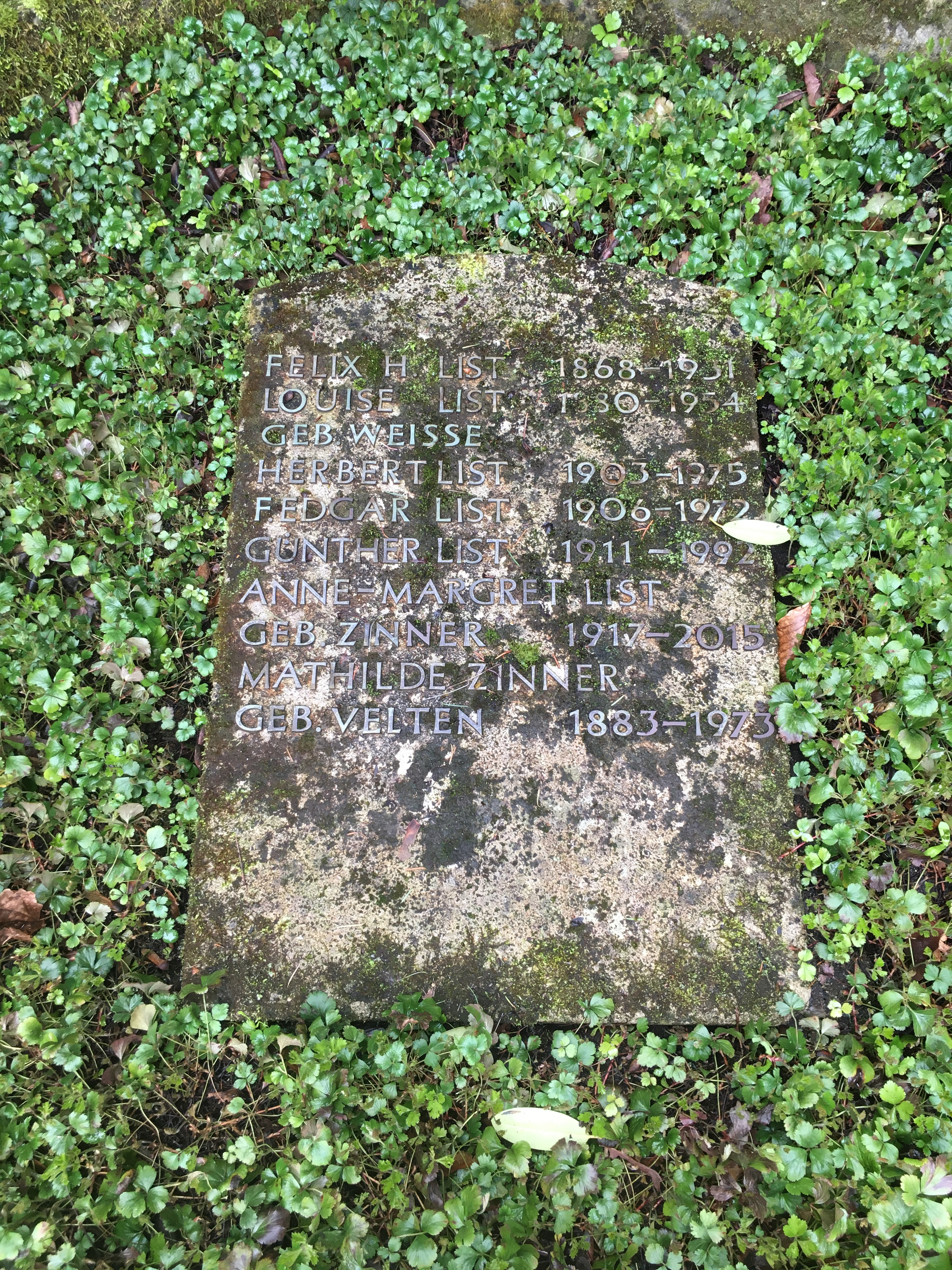
Grave of Herbert List in Friedhof Ohlsdorf, Hamburg

List died in Munich on 4 April 1975, and his archive was absorbed in the Ratjen collection which was later acquired by the National Gallery in Washington.

== Exhibitions ==
=== Solo exhibitions ===
- 1937 Galerie du Chasseur d'Images, Paris
- 1940 Parnassos Galerie, Athens.
- 1976 Neue Sammlung, München, Germany
- Museum für Kunst und Gewerbe, Hamburg, Germany
- 1977 Kunsthaus, ZUrich (CH). Kunstverein, Frankfurt, Germany.
- PPS Galerie, Düsseldorf, Germany
- 1980 I.C.P., New York (USA)
- Photographers' Gallery, London, Great Britain
- 1981 Galleria Rondanini, Rome, Italy.
- 1983 Musee d'Art Moderne de la Ville de Paris.

=== Group exhibitions ===
- Fotografische Kunsterbildnisse, Museum Ludwig, Koln, Germany
- 1978 Das Experimentelle Photo in Deutschland 1918–40, Galleria del Levante, München, Germany
- 1979 Photographie Als Kunst 1879–1979
- Moderna Museet, Stockholm, Sweden
- Photographic Surrealism, New Gallery of Contemporary Art, Cleveland (USA)
- 1980 Avant-Garde Photography In Germany 1919–1939, San Francisco Museum of Modern Art
- 1981 Dog Show N°I, Nikon Fotogalerie, Zürich, Switzerland
- Landschaften, PPS Galerie, Hamburg, Germany.

== Books by Herbert List ==
- List, H. (1953). Licht über Hellas: Eine Symphonie in Bildern. München: G.D.W. Callwey.
- List, Herbert; Mollier, Hans (1960), Rome, Hill and Wang
- List, Herbert (1958), Caribia: ein photographisches Skizzenbuch von den Caribischen Inseln, Rowohlt
- De Sica, Vittorio; List, Herbert (1968), Napoli e i suoi personaggi, Rizzoli
- Fagg, William; List, Herbert (1963), Nigerian images: the splendor of African sculpture, Frederick A. Praeger
- List, Herbert; Spender, Stephen (1988), Herbert List: Junge Männer (1st ed.), Thames and Hudson, ISBN 978-0-500-54147-0
- List, Herbert; Scheler, Max (1995), Italy, Thames and Hudson, ISBN 978-0-500-54196-8
- Commandeur, Werner; List, Herbert; Sterzel, Alfred (1965), Das Wunder drüben sind die Frauen: Begegnungen zwischen Dresden und Rügen, Lübbe Verlag
- Stiftung Ratjen; List, Herbert; Harprath, Richard; Dreyer, Peter; Rapp, Jürgen; Ratjen, Wolfgang; Staatliche Graphische Sammlung München (1977), Stiftung Ratjen : Italienische Zeichnungen des 16.-18. Jahrhunderts: eine Ausstellung zum Andenken an Herbert List, Prestel-Verlag, ISBN 978-3-7913-0428-1

== Compilations ==
- US Camera Year-Book, New York 1957
- DU, Zürich 1973
- Portraits, Hoffmann & Campe, Hamburg 1977
- Photographs 1930-1970, Thames and Hudson, London und Rizzoli, New York 1980
- Fotografien 1930-1970; 1980 neu herausgegeben von Max Scheler unter dem Titel: Fotografie Metafisica
- Herbert List. I grandi fotografi. Milano 1982, deutsch München 1983
- Herbert List, Memento 1945. Münchner Ruinen. Fotomusem München. Schirmer/Mosel, München 1995 ISBN 3-88814-763-8
- Max Scheler und Matthias Harder (Hrsg.). Herbert List. Die Monographie. Mit einem Geleitwort von Bruce Weber und Texten von Herbert List u.a. Schirmer/Mosel, München 2000, ISBN 3-88814-533-3

== Bibliography ==
- Boris von Brauchitsch: Das Magische im Vorübergehen. Herbert List und die Fotografie. Lit, Münster und Hamburg 1992 ISBN 3-89473-392-6
- Werner Brück: Wie erzählt Herbert List? Die "Antillia"-Bilder ("Du", September 1958, Jg. 18). Humanistisch engagierte Fotografie. recenseo, Bern, 2018. ISBN 978-3-7481-3371-1
- Emanuel Eckardt: Herbert List. Ellert und Richter, Hamburg 2003, ISBN 3-8319-0131-7
- Stephen Spender, 'Der Junge Herbert List', in Gunter Metken, ed., Herbert List (1980)
