= Gaston Paris (photographer) =

French 20th-century photographer and journalist

Gaston Paris (1903–1964) was a frequently published autodidactic photographer and journalist, notably for the magazine Vu.

== Early life ==
Born in Paris, 1903 (or 1905 according to some sources), from about 1908 he was in foster care with a family in Alençon, before his military service in the Ruhr. Little is known about his personal life.

== Career ==
From 1929, aged 26, he published articles on films in Cinémagazine, then photographed for Art et Médecine (from 1931) and reported for the theatrical review La Rampe (1932–1933), then worked alongside Roger Schall, Jean Morel, Louis Caillaud, Olga Solarics (Studio Manasse), and Brassaï for Paris Magazine, a magazine of erotica. Such experience led him to be appointed under contract on July 1, 1933 (renewed in 1936) as the only salaried photographer for the magazine Vu, for which he made more than 1,300 photos. His work was more widely recognized in 1936 with his participation in the International Exhibition of Contemporary Photography in Paris. Through the thirties, at different times he had studios in the 2nd arrondissement at 27, boulevard des Italiens and 6 rue d'Uzès, both a short walk to the sites of his theatrical pictures; the Folies Bergère, Paris Opera, and the Casino de Paris, where he photographed music hall artists including Maurice Chevalier, whom he also showed informally strolling with the children of Belleville, and amongst the crowds of other 'Paris Zones'.

He mentored Willy Rizzo, 25 years his younger, also a frequent photographer of celebrities and film stars. In the course of his reportage Paris himself photographed many, including French artists Moïse Kisling, André Dignimont, Yves Brayer, and engraver Albert Decaris; French actors Max Dearly, Josette Day, Colette Darfeuil, Brigitte Bardot, Harry Baur. Blanchette Brunoy, Geneviève Cluny, France Delahalle, Ginette Leclerc, Christine Carère, Véra Norman, Anne Doat, Jean Chevrier, Pierrette Bruno and Swiss actor Michel Simon; singers Edith Piaf, André Claveau, Henri Salvador and Egyptian-born Reda Cairo; variety artists Charpini and Brancato; directors Henri-Georges Clouzot, Christian-Jaque and Christian Matras, students of Alberte Aveline's class at the Paris Opera ballet school; writers Pierre Mac Orlan and Georges Simenon; and Jean Cocteau and Jean Marais in Les Parents terribles; as well as politicians and military officers. By arrangement with Bibliothèque Historique de la Ville de Paris, Roger-Viollet Agency holds those portraits amongst 15,000 of Gaston Paris' other negatives

Paris joined the group of photographers Le Rectangle in 1937, and stopped working for VU in 1938. Until 1940 and the German Occupation he worked for Paris Match. In 1940, he worked as a freelancer, like other French photographers, for the magazine La Semaine, controlled by the Vichy authorities. His 1944 photographs of the Liberation were featured in Jacques de Lacretelle's book Liberation of Paris, 1945, and he visited Germany 1945–1946 with the French occupation troops to investigate the destruction of the country. His imagery appeared intermittently in Nuit et Jour (1946–1947) and in 1948 he photographed at the Fresnes prison to illustrate Levée d'énuro, by Georges Lupo. He was photographer for Détective magazine from the late 1930s to the 1950s.

== Late career ==
In his, and the century's, fifties Paris continued to work, undertaking a wide variety of commissions for film stills, celebrity portraits and photo-novels. He died in Paris in 1964.

== Exhibitions ==
- 1936: International Exhibition of Contemporary Photography, Paris
- 1937: Exposition internationale des arts et des techniques dans la vie moderne. Paris; solo exhibition Gaston Paris, 27, boulevard des Italiens, Paris
- 1937 Exposition internationale des arts et des techniques dans la vie moderne. Paris; Présentation Photographique du Concours Scolaire; Photos by Gaston Paris
- 2012/13, 17 October – 14 January: Here is Paris: photographic modernities, 1920-1950: the Christian Bouqueret collection. Pompidou Centre, Graphic Art Gallery and Museum Gallery
- 2013, 2 January: 1925 – 1935, Une décennie bouleversante; Marcel Artaud, Laure-Albin Guillot, Boris Lipnitzki, Jean Moral, André Papillon, Gaston Paris. Musée Nicéphore Niépce, 28 quai des Messageries, Chalon-sur-Saône
- 2014, 28 May – 15 June: De Vu à Détective: Gaston Paris. Théâtre de la Mer (salle Tarbouriech), Promenade Maréchal Leclerc, Sète
- 2018, 7 July – 16 September: 1925–1935, Une décennie bouleversante, La photographie au service de la modernité. Musée du Château des ducs de Wurtemberg, Montbéliard
- 2019, 23 March – 30 June: Reiss-Engelhorn-Museen, Mannheim.
- 2020, 10 July – 29 November: Alain Adler & Gaston Paris. The Rio, 7 Quai Léopold Suquet, Sète
- 2022, 19 January–18 April: Gaston Paris, Reporter, Centre Pompidou, Paris
- 2022, 20 January – 23 April: Gaston Paris, the fantastic eye, Roger-Viollet Gallery, 6 Rue de Seine, 75006 Paris

== Collections ==
- Roger-Viollet Agency
- Bibliothèque Historique de la Ville de Paris

== Publications about ==
- Reiss-Engelhorn-Museen (Mannheim, Allemagne); et al. Gaston Paris: die unersättliche Kamera, Köln: Buchhandlung Walther König, 2019.
