= Yvonne Chevalier =

French magazine photographer active 1929–1970

Yvonne Chevalier (18 January 1899 – 22 June 1982) was a French magazine photographer who was active from 1929 to 1970.

== Early life and education ==
Yvonne Chevalier, née Gaulard, was born into a well-to-do Catholic family on 18 January 1899 in the 9th arrondissement of Paris where she completed her primary and secondary education before studying painting and drawing. She made her first photographs at the age of ten while on holiday at Saint-Valery-en-Caux.

== Career ==
Gaulard married a doctor in 1920 and their daughter was born the next year. In 1925 Chevalier encountered the work of David Octavius Hill which she admired, and in 1929 she abandoned fine art for photography. She set up a studio in the Impasse Nansouty in the 14th arrondissement, Paris in 1930. Russian émigré writer Pierre Tugal interviewed the couple for an article “The masters of photography” in La Revue du Médecin of May that year which was illustrated predominantly with her photographs in the 'New Vision' modernist style for which she and Denise Bellon, Florence Henri, Nora Dumas and Ergy Landau are known. Tugal wrote that;

"Ms. Yvonne Chevalier, who is becoming a photographer of the highest order, pursues her research quite independently of her husband. It is not so much the human figure that attracts her as the picturesque aspects of life, be it rocks, machinery or a market corner. The science of lighting is innate to her and she takes objects from such an angle that it seems that she extracts the life of things to infuse them with a new one according to her wishes."

Chevalier joined Jean Moral, Daniel Masclet, and Emmanuel Sougez as one of the main French photographers of the loosely affiliated group of mostly immigrant inter-war modernists, The School of Paris.

The Chevalier couple made friends of personalities in literature, the visual arts and music, whom she photographed, recording portraits of Arthur Honegger, André Gide (and in 1951, his death mask), Colette, Mariette Lydis, Camille Claudel, François Mauriac, Antoine de Saint-Exupéry, Max Jacob, Pierre Teilhard de Chardin, the bookseller Adrienne Monnier and her friends, and intimate studies of writer and Resistance fighter Jean Prévost. She was herself photographed in 1932 by the German Marianne Breslauer.

In 1931 she produced stills for the film Baleydier starring Michel Simon and in 1935 documented the sculpture of Auguste Rodin in a series of close-ups. She contributed illustrations for the magazines Arts et Métiers Graphiques, Photo Graphie, Le Cinegraph, Musica and Photo Illustration, and from this time on she was personal photographer of the expressionist painter Georges Rouault.

In 1936 Chevalier was a founder, with Emmanuel Sougez, of the association Le Rectangle, the only woman amongst its thirteen members, and participated in all of its exhibitions including those at La Galerie de la Pléiade, Galerie René van den Berg and François Tuefferd's gallery, Le Chasseur d'Images, and held two solo shows in 1935 and 1937, both at the gallery of the Librairie Van den Berg. In the following year she photographed the artists at the Pavilion de la Danse, and produced reportage on Algeria and Le Midi. In 1938 she documented performers at the Ambassadeurs theatre, Paris.

Just before the outbreak of World War II, in 1939 Chevalier recorded the architecture of the Abbaye du Thoronet. However, the majority of her work was destroyed during the war. Photo historian Christian Bouqueret (1950-2013) later rediscovered and promoted her work.

After the War, Le Rectangle disbanded and in 1946 she became co-founder of the group Les XV and until 1950 exhibited with them. At their 1946 exhibition at the 17th Art Salon, president of the jury J. M. Auradon remarked on her work;

"...the portrait by Yvonne Chevalier on the previous panel, reveals in Tuefferd a delicate sensibility, which vibrates in its atmosphere of light grays, comparable to pencil drawings in manner and genre. We loved her fantasies, the fountain, and the one who sticks out his tongue; the foliage is very beautiful. We lingered over the beautiful portrait of Mme X..., by Yvonne Chevalier, beautifully executed, beautiful realisation of values, sincere; the same praise for nos. 336 and 340 by this same artist; these very different proofs proceed from the same spirit and deserve praise; Yvonne Chevalier does not reveal her process, but it is a style that she knows how to create for herself."

In the following year at the Second National Salon of Photography in Paris, Auradon praised as "assez mystérieuse" her Ophélie, inspired by the death mask of l'Inconnue de la Seine, while journalist Germain Paterne considered it "a remarkable idea, but…. perhaps not dramatically enough realised."

In 1949 Yvonne joined her old friend Marcelle Auclair in an assignment on Carmelite nuns for the Foundation of Sainte Therese d’ Avila. She also illustrated novels Le Lys dans la Vallee by Honoré de Balzac, Alain-Fournier's Le Grand Meaulnes and Marc Chadourne's Cecile de la Folie.

In 1970 she stopped all photographic activity and after editing her archive during 1980, she died on 22 June 1982 in Paris.

== Exhibitions ==
- 1932 Art Phototypique, Palais du Tennis, Paris
- 1934 Galerie de la Pléiade
- 1935 Librairie Van den Berg, Paris (solo)
- 1935 La Publicite par la Photographie, Galerie de la Pléiade, Paris
- 1936 Groupe Le Rectangle, Musée des Arts Décoratifs, Paris
- 1936 Nus et Architecture, Galerie Van den Berg (solo)
- 1937 Jeunes Filles el Paysages, Librairie René Van den Berg, Paris (solo)
- 1937 Exposition Internationale, Galerie d'Art et Industrie, Paris
- 1937 Portraits of Writers, Galerie de la Pléiade, Paris
- 1938 Le Rectangle, Galerie Le Chasseur d'Image
- 1938 Salon International de la Photo, Paris
- 1939 Le Visage De La France, Palais des Beaux-Arts, Brussels, Belgium
- 1942 Exposition Nationale Artisanale, Paris
- 1946, May 29 to June 22: Le Groupe des XV, Salon National de la Photographie, Bibliothèque Nationale, Paris
- 1947, Second National Salon of Photography, Paris
- 1947 The Nude, Groupe des XV, Galerie Pascaud, Paris
- 1948 Le Livre Illustre par la Photographie, Cercle de la Librairie, Paris
- 1949 Groupe des XV, Galerie Mirador, Paris
- 1949 Salon National de la photographie, Bibliothèque Nationale, Paris
- 1950 Groupe des XV, Galerie Pascaud, Paris
- 1990 Retrospective, Nicéphore Niépce Museum, Chalon-sur-Saône
- 1998 Femmes photographes de la nouvelle vision en France (1920-1940), Paris, hôtel de Sully.

== Collections ==
- Centre Pompidou, Musée National d'Art Moderne
- National Gallery of Art, Washington
