= Philippe Pottier =

Philippe Pottier may refer to:

- Philippe Pottier (1938–1985), Swiss footballer
- Philippe Pottier (1905–1991), French fashion photographer

== See also ==
- Pierre-Philippe Potier (1708–1781), Belgian Jesuit priest and lexicographer
