= Henry de Monfreid =

French adventurer, writer and sailor (1879–1974)

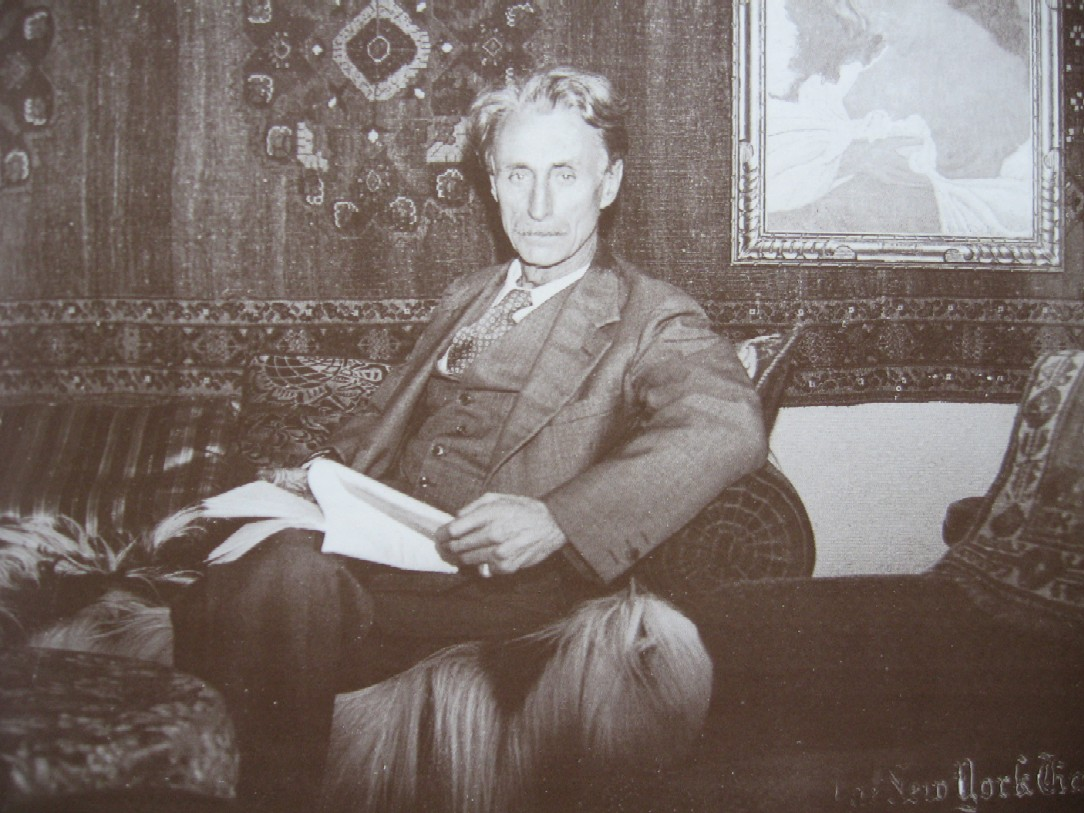
Henry de Monfreid at his Paris home published in The New York Times, 1930s

Henry de Monfreid (14 November 1879 in Leucate – 13 December 1974) was a French adventurer, a prolific writer, sailor, a smuggler, a shipowner, a hashish trader, and perhaps a spy. Born in Leucate, Aude, France, he was the son of artist painter Georges-Daniel de Monfreid and knew Paul Gauguin as a child.

Monfreid was known for his travels in the Red Sea and the Horn of Africa coast from Tanzania to Aden, Yemen, the Arabian Peninsula and Suez, that he sailed in his various expeditions as adventurer, smuggler and gunrunner (during which he said he more than once escaped Royal Navy coast-guard cutters).

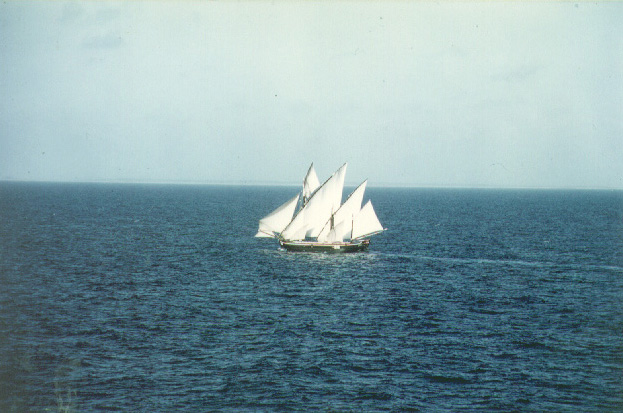
Monfreid's Altair, cutting through the Bab-el-Mandeb strait waters on a fair monsoon day, might have looked like this dhow

== Life ==
In 1911, following in the footsteps of Arthur Rimbaud, Monfreid went to Djibouti, then a French colony, in order to trade coffee. He built a dhow for himself and used it to cross the Red Sea. He had many adventures, eventually prospered, bought a house near the shore in Obock cove, and had a large schooner, the Altair ("Soaring Eagle"), built by a local shipyard. Towards the end of the war, he settled with his family in Obock, away from prying eyes and other colonial governors of Djibouti. His house was near the shore, which allowed his wife to have lights on the terrace if the coastguard spotlight was on the lookout. Completely absorbed in his projects, Monfreid was almost always absent and his wife suffered from his long absences and the overpowering heat of the place. She and the children often took refuge in the Mabla Mountains in the hinterland of Obock Region, which offered a little coolness. In the early twenties, he built a small house Araoué near Harar in Ethiopia, and spent the hot season there with his family. He made enough profit through trafficking (the sale of hashish in Egypt in particular) to buy a flour mill and build a power plant in Dire Dawa, a boomtown that had emerged at the foot of Harar during the construction of the first section of the Djibouti-Addis Ababa road. Between 1912 and 1940 he ran guns through the area, dived for pearls and sea cucumbers, and smuggled hashish and morphine, which he bought from a famous German laboratory, into Egypt, earning several stays in prison. Monfreid always denied having taken part in the slave trade from Africa to Arabia.

He converted to Islam during this period, which included undergoing a circumcision and taking a Muslim name: Abd-el-Haï ("Slave of The Living One").

During the 1930s, Monfreid was persuaded by Joseph Kessel to write about his adventures, and the stories became bestsellers.

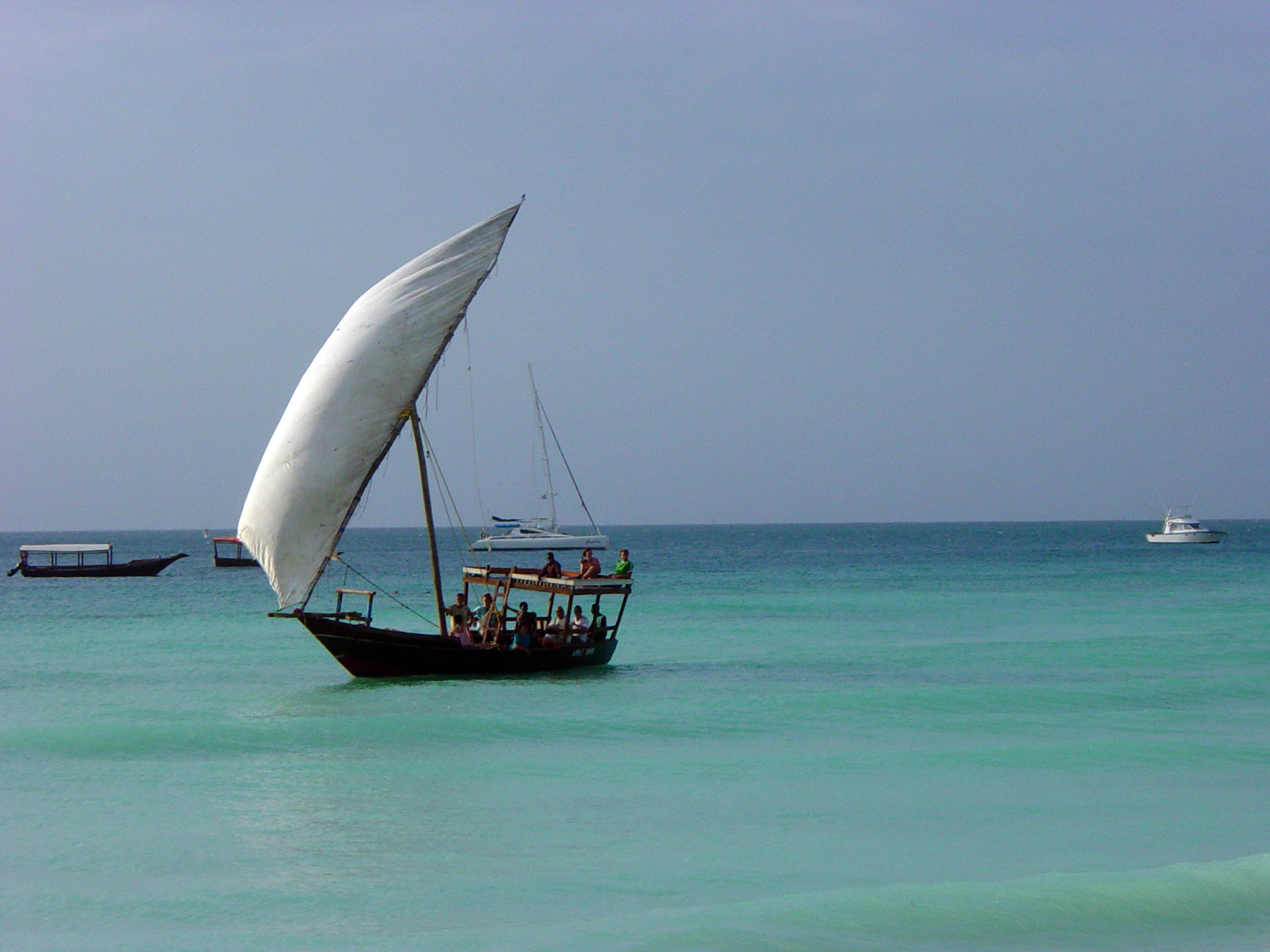
A small dhow now used for beach-promenade. Monfreid wrote that he was glad once to have Muslim ladies en route for the hajj crouching on his deck, on the Red Sea between Obock and Jeddah: the officers of the Aden Royal Navy cutter did not dare to offend against haram, and gave up stopping and examining his boat, which was loaded with contraband.

During World War II, Monfreid, who was now more than sixty years old, was captured by the British and deported to Kenya as he had served the Italians and his wife, born Armgart Freudenfeld, was daughter to the former German governor of Alsace-Lorraine.

After the war Monfreid retired to a mansion in a small village of la France profonde, in Ingrandes (département of the Indre), France. There he played piano, wrote, painted, and quietly raised in his garden a plantation of opium poppies, and adopted the habit of using the local grocer's scales to weigh his crop and divide it into daily portions. The grocer paid no heed, since Monfreid's household were good customers, and Monfreid himself bought huge amounts of honey, which he took to counter the costive effects of opium. Eventually Monfreid was betrayed to the local gendarmerie, but he escaped prosecution; at that time opium was used only by unconventional artists, like his friend Jean Cocteau. Monfreid boasted in his books about his ability to manipulate and divert prying law enforcers through clever speech.

Monfreid settled down to a life of writing, turning out around 70 books over the next 30 years. Only a handful of his books have been translated into English and they are difficult to find. His daughter Gisèle de Monfreid wrote Mes secrets de la Mer Rouge, describing what life was like with her father and the dangerous life he led.

During barren periods, when writing was not bringing in enough money, Monfreid relied upon mortgaging the family collection of Gauguin paintings. Only after his death were these discovered to be fake.

"I have lived a rich, restless, magnificent life", Monfreid declared a few days before dying in 1974 at the age of 95.

== Beliefs ==
Monfreid affirmed himself to be "sick and disgusted with businessmen... who ruin with impunity the poor innocents who believe in the value of justice, honesty, integrity and conscience." He feared "to be obliged to accept the slavery of some dreary job and become a domestic animal." His business dealings were a means for Monfreid to pursue his exploration of Africa. He fully acknowledged his naïveté in the realm of business and trusted mostly in his intuition and Providence to sustain him.

Monfreid loved adventure. He longed only to be with "the sea, the wind, the virgin sand of the desert, the infinity of far-off skies in which wheel the numberless hosts of the skies... and the dream that I became one with them." When he saw the Pyramids for the first time, he could not wait to leave. "The only thing that one might possibly admire is the stupendous effort it took to build them, and this admiration demands the mentality of a German tourist," he wrote.

== Bibliography ==
by Monfreid

- Les secrets de la mer Rouge (Grasset, 1931)
  - First English edition published in 1934 by Faber & Faber, London under the title "Secrets of the Red Sea".
- Aventures de mer (Grasset, 1932)
  - First English edition published in 1937 by Methuen & Co, London under the title "Sea Adventures".
- La croisière du hachich (Grasset, 1933)
  - First English edition published in 1935 by Methuen & Co, London under the title "Hashish".
- Vers les terres hostiles de l'Éthiopie (Grasset, 1933)
- La poursuite du Kaïpan (Grasset, 1934)
- Le naufrage de la Marietta (Grasset, 1934)
- Le drame éthiopien (Grasset, 1935)
- Le lépreux (Grasset, 1935)
- Les derniers jours de l'Arabie Heureuse (N.R.F., 1935)
- Les guerriers de l'Ogaden (N.R.F., 1936)
- Le masque d'or (Grasset, 1936)
- L'avion noir (Grasset, 1936)
- Le Roi des abeilles (Gallimard)
- Le Trésor du pélerin (Gallimard, 1938)
- Charras (Editions du Pavois, 1947)
- Du Harrar au Kenya (Grasset, 1949)
- L'homme sorti de la mer (Grasset, 1951)
- Ménélik tel qu’il fut (Grasset, 1954)
- Sous le masque Mau-Mau (Grasset, 1956)
- Mon aventure à l'île des Forbans (Grasset, 1958)
- Le Radeau de la Méduse : comment fut sauvé Djibouti (Grasset, 1958)
- Les Lionnes d'or d'Ethiopie (Laffont, 1964)
- Le Feu de Saint-Elme (Laffont, 1973)
- Journal de bord (Arthaud, 1984)
- Lettres d'Abyssinie (Flammarion, 1999)
- Lettres de la mer Rouge (Flammarion, 2000)

by Monfreid's daughter, Gisèle

- Mes secrets de la Mer rouge (Editions France-Empire, 1982)

by Ida Treat

- Pearls, Arms and Hashish (Coward-McCann, 1930)
  - This book was written by Ida Treat based on conversations she had with Monfreid while visiting him in Djibouti at the end of the 1920s. The book was published in the United States before Monfreid started to write about his adventures himself. The material in the book is a description of the same events which Monfreid told, in much more detail, in his first three books: Les secrets de la mer Rouge, Aventures de mer and La croisière du hachich.

== Discography ==
Henry de Monfreid chante la mer, 33 rpm, PolyGram distribution, PY 899, (Henry de Monfreid sings sea shanties, and plays piano)

== In popular culture ==
In The Adventures of Tintin comic Cigars of the Pharaoh, the hero and his dog are cast adrift in sarcophagi in the Red Sea. They are then picked up by a passing sailing ship captained by a man who turns out to be a gunrunner. The captain was based on de Monfreid.

Film: Les Secrets de la mer Rouge (1937)

Television series: Les Secrets de la mer Rouge (1968–1975)
