= Roger Schall =

Roger Schall (25 July 1904 – December 4 1995) was a French photographer and photojournalist who practiced from the end of the 1920s until the 1970s. During World War II, Schall secretly documented the Nazi occupation of Paris. The studio he opened in Montmartre with his brother in 1931 worked as an agency, distributing images in numerous magazines: Vu, Vogue Paris, L'Illustration, Life, Paris Match… 150 covers and 10,000 photos published. Roger Schall produced fashion photography for the fetish clothing company Diana Slip. He photographed many celebrities of his time including Gabrielle Chanel, Colette and Marlène Dietrich.

== Biography ==
Born in Nancy on July 25, 1904, Roger Schall and his family arrived in Paris in 1911. His father Emile worked as a photographer in schools. During the war, the family moved to Les Sables-d'Olonne. In 1924, Roger Schall did his military service in Strasbourg. He was sent to the photographic section in Lebanon in the spring of 1925. At the end of his service, he returned to work with his father, while taking evening classes to perfect his knowledge of drawing and painting. In 1929, Roger Schall spent all his savings on a Leica camera. It was with this camera and a Rolleiflex bought in the early 1930s that Roger Schall wandered the streets of Paris in search of picturesque scenes. In 1931, Roger Schall opened a studio in Montmartre with his brother Raymond, which then became the Schall frères studio and then Schall Presse. Roger Schall illustrated articles with photographies, including a few special issues for l'Art Vivant. He worked for Vu magazine. Like many photographers of his time, Roger Schall worked mainly on commission and reserved his production for publications. At this time, he also made a series of nudes in his studio which were published in Paris Magazine.

In 1934, Vogue Paris editor-in-chief Michel de Brunhoff introduced him to the world of fashion. His report on the Jubilee of King George V in London that same year was published in the English edition of Vogue. After producing a series on the construction of the streamline Normandie, he was sent by Vu on le Normandie to cover the inaugural trip from Le Havre to New York in May 1935. Roger Schall was the exclusive photographer for the Transatlantic Company, sharing his cabin with Blaise Cendrars. He took advantage of his stay in the United States to take photographs of New York. He was sent by Vu to Berlin to cover the preparation for the 1936 Olympic Games. He worked there with Ullstein, the magazines Die Dame and Berliner Illustrierte. Roger Schall took several photographs from the World Fair held in 1937, the balls and social events, horse races and car elegance contests.

For the first issue of Match Roger Schall travels to Morocco with Colette for a report on the wedding of the sons of Pacha El Glaoui. He also made photographs of the casbahs of Marrakech and on the French foreign legion. In the autumn, his report on the Nuremberg Congress was made a special issue of Match. In 1939, Life Magazine commissioned him a report on Switzerland and the military organization. Passive defense, the Maginot line. Also for Life Magazine, Roger Schall went to Berlin for a report on a National Socialist family. Mobilized in 1940, Roger Schall was assigned to a medical train in Verdun, where he carried out photo-cinema missions. Demobilized after the defeat of France, he returned to Paris, under the Occupation. In Paris, the Propagandastaffel controlled all publications. In 1942, Roger Schall received an authorization to keep exercising his activity as a photographer. He continued to work for Marie Claire and in 1943 visited his fashion designer clients for the presentation of the collections in Lyon. He then left for Corsica to complete the second edition of Reflets de France, a collection of more than 300 photographs, edited by his brother Raymond and published for the first time in 1942. Several other editions were later published: in 1943 with a preface by Henry de Montherlant, then in 1950 at Gründ editions. In 1944, the first publication of the book A Paris sous la botte des Nazis, testimony in images of the four years of Occupation. This book, prefaced by General de Gaulle, was edited by Raymond Schall with photographs by Roger Schall, Robert Doisneau, Roger Parry, Jean Séeberger, André Papillon, Pierre Jahan, Maurice Jarnoux, and texts by Jean Eparvier.

After the war, Roger Schall developed an advertising activity: launching perfumes for Guerlain, Nina Ricci, Marcel Rochas. Roger Schall produces advertising photographs for the Cristalleries de Saint Louis and Christofle.

In 1967, Roger Schall entrusted the studio to his son Jean-Frédéric Schall to devote himself to the management of his large collection of documents. He died in Paris on December 4, 1995, leaving a collection of over 80,000 photographs.
