= Cinémagazine =

French cinema magazine

- Categories: Cinema
- Frequency: Monthly
- Founded: 1921
- Final issue: 1935
- Country: France

Cinémagazine was a French weekly (later monthly) magazine about cinema from 1921 to 1935.

== History and profile ==
Cinémagazine was established in 1921. It was published weekly from 1921 to 1930, and then monthly from 1930 to 1934. Its editorial board included Marcel Carné, Maurice Bessy, Jean Dréville, Robert Florey, Charles Ford, René Jeanne and Émile Vuillermoz. Contributing photographers included Gaston Paris.

The magazine published many articles against sound film.
