= Central Dupon Images =

French photography company

Central Color
- Company type: Limited Public
- Industry: Photography
- Founded: 1952
- Headquarters: Paris, France
- Key people: Lucien Lorelle, Founder and former President of Central Color (1952–ca. 1960s); Françoise Gallois, former President of Central Color (ca. 1960s–2003), Christine Gallois, Chief of operations Central Color (1980s-1995); Jean-François Gallois, former President of Central Color (2003–2012); Jean-François Camp, President of Central Dupon Images (2004 - present
- Products: Photos
- Number of employees: 80 (approx.)

Central Dupon Images is a professional photography company located in Paris, France. The company is the result of a 2012 merger between Central Color and Dupon Images.

== History ==
Central Color was founded in 1952 by the French photographer Lucien Lorelle, who handed over the company to his daughter Françoise Gallois, president of the Central Color Group and wife to former Brigadier General, novelist and politician, Pierre Gallois.

Central Color operated in Greenburgh, New York from 1983 to 2001. Central Color (U.S.) was owned and operated by François Gallois grandson of Lucien Lorelle and son of Françoise Gallois.
