= Ina Bandy =

Humanist photographer

Ina Bandy (born Ida Gurevitsch, 14 October 1903 – 1973) was a humanist photographer. Specialising in photographs of children, her work is held in the French National Archives and the Bibliothèque nationale de France.

== Biography ==
Bandy was born Ida Gurevitsch to a relatively non-religious Jewish family in Tallinn, Estonia, then a part of the Russian Empire. Her family escaped to Moscow at the outbreak of war in 1914, but the Revolution of 1917 nevertheless claimed the life of one of her brothers.

In the early 1920s, Bandy remained in Moscow while her mother accompanied her youngest brother Benjamin to Germany. At this time, Bandy met Nicolas Neumann (alias Nicolas Bandy), a Hungarian photographer who mentored her in photography. They married in 1925 but were to divorce later – even so, Ina Bandy would keep her pseudonym, moving to Germany before settling in France during the early 1930s. In Paris, she became a member of Alliance Photo, a photographic agency founded by René Zuber and directed by Maria Eisner, but she would cross into the zone libre at the outbreak of World War II.

After World War II, Bandy went back to Paris and moved into the Hotel de Paix, where she set up her workshop on the ground floor.

She produced photographic commissions for various newspapers and magazines such as ELLE, Médecine de France and Art News. While photographing a group of children living at a Paris Metro station for the Combat newspaper, Bandy met Robert Ardouvin, founder of ‘Les Amis des Enfants de Paris’. From 1948 the association housed underprivileged children in a village in Vercheny and Bandy helped to photograph these children, remaining attached to the ‘Village D’Enfants’ until her death in 1973.

In 1948, Ina Bandy also became a member of Le Groupe des XV, putting her in the company of other humanist photographers such as Willy Ronis and Sabine Weiss.

Bandy also worked for organisations such as UNESCO, Air France, the French National Archives and the Louvre. Her friendship with Régine Pernoud, a French medieval historian, would also lead her to take photographs of seals, medals, and medieval churches.

== Collections, exhibitions and published work ==
=== Collections ===
A collection of Bandy's photographs are held at the BnF and the French National Archives. She was commissioned by Régine Pernoud, conservator at the Museum of History in France between 1949 and 1974.

The Courtauld Institute of Art also holds photographs by Bandy in the Conway Library. They are currently being digitised by the Courtauld Institute of Art, as part of the Courtauld Connects project.

=== Exhibitions ===
2006-2007: La photographie humaniste: 1945-1968 (curated by Laure Beaumont-Maillet, Francoise Denoyelle). Bibliothèque Nationale de France, Paris.

2013: La vie a fleur d’objectif, a solo exhibition of Ina Bandy's works, the Gallery of the Alliance Française de Bruxelles-Europe, Brussels.

=== Published work ===
Bandy has contributed photographs for various works written by André Malraux, including his three volumes on The Psychology of Art (published 1947–1949). Her photographs taken in Sri Lanka between 1955 and 1956 are used as sources for the illustrations in E. F. C. Ludowyk's book The Footprint of the Buddha.
