= Le Groupe des XV =

French humanist photography collective

Le Groupe des XV was a collective founded in 1946 by fifteen (hence its name) French humanist photographers who exhibited annually in Paris until 1957. Its objective was to have photography recognised as an art form in its own right, and to use it to preserve French photographic heritage.

== Founding members ==
- Marcel Amson
- Jean-Marie Auradon
- Marcel Bovis
- André Garban
- René-Jacques
- Pierre Laval
- Lucien Lorelle
- Daniel Masclet
- Jean Michaud
- Philippe Pottier
- Albert Séeberger
- Jean Séeberger
- Louis-Victor Emmanuel Sougez
- François Tuefferd

== Members from 1948 ==
- Marcel Amson
- Jean-Marie Auradon
- Ina Bandy
- Marcel Bovis
- Jean-Philippe Charbonnier
- Yvonne Chevalier
- Jean Dieuzaide
- Robert Doisneau
- Édith Gérin
- Léon Herschtritt
- Pierre Ichac
- Pierre Jahan
- Henri Lacheroy
- Laval
- Thérèse Le Prat
- Jean Marquis
- Jean Michaud
- Janine Niépce
- André Papillon
- Willy Ronis
- Éric Schwab
- René Servant
- Jean-Louis Swiners
- François Tuefferd
- Sabine Weiss

== Professional organisation ==
Annual exhibitions of their work were organised by André Garban, assisted in the background by Emmanuel Sougez, founder in 1937 of the group Le Rectangle, a predecessor Parisian photographer association active until all professional organisations were dissolved during the Occupation under Vichy rule. Several Le Groupe des XV members had formerly been in Rectangle and in 1946 they regarded themselves and their invited recruits as friends who had a common interest in artistic photography, naming the group "by analogy with the spirit of team and the sports camaraderie that animates rugby clubs".

== Ethos ==
The group's manifesto echoes that of Le Rectangle, providing a continuum between the 1930s and the immediate post-war:

"loving above all their profession, animated by the same faith and eager to endow photographic art of quality works, each [...] member formally commits himself to respect the spirit of loyalty, frankness and mutual assistance which is the very basis of the grouping".

They espoused:

"Respect for process! - Real photography - The perfect negative - And if possible, no retouching; that ‘maid-of-all-work’ to the bad photographer! No blur either; such a "myopic style"! And as much as possible new ideas, new angles, originality [...]. Our tradition: Hill, Nadar, Atget, Weston, Cartier-Bresson."

== Defining the status of the profession ==
All members were professionals in both their motivation and in deriving their income from commissions with, among other outlets, magazines Plaisir de France and Réalités favouring their work during the boom in pictorial magazines. The chief chronicler of Les Groupe des XV, Marcel Bovis, in particular, was concerned with the status of their medium:

"At a time when the profession of photographer-illustrator is classed with manufacturers of funerary wreaths, it is above all a question of asserting the notion of profession by a demanding conception of photography in all fields".

1946, the year of the group's founding, was in a period in which professional organisations and the place of the arts and crafts within them was being reassessed, Le Groupe des XV also created, as an annex to the group, the Society of Illustrators and Author Photographers: the SIAP. This entity administered by the XV replaced the Artisanal Professional Groups of the 1940s, enforcing copyright and reproduction, the code of ethics and pricing, without forgetting "to create between its members links of confraternity".

== Exhibitions ==
For the annual exhibitions of Le Groupe des XV, Garban secured venues at the Galerie Jean Pascaud, 165 Boulevard Haussmann, at the Cercle de la Librairie, boulevard Saint-Germain or the Galerie Mirador, Place Vendôme, as well as offering his own portrait studio in rue Bourdaloue (9th arrondissement) for meetings. From 1946 he established the National Exhibition of Photography in the Galerie Mansart, Bibliothèque nationale de France.

== Humanist photography ==
The group had in common an interest in documenting the life of the street as a representation of French culture and valued the contribution of Surrealism and of the New Objectivity to their imagery, but they rejected pictorialism. Consequently, the majority contributed significantly to French humanist photography.
