= Ida Treat =

American university teacher and paleontologist (1889–1978)

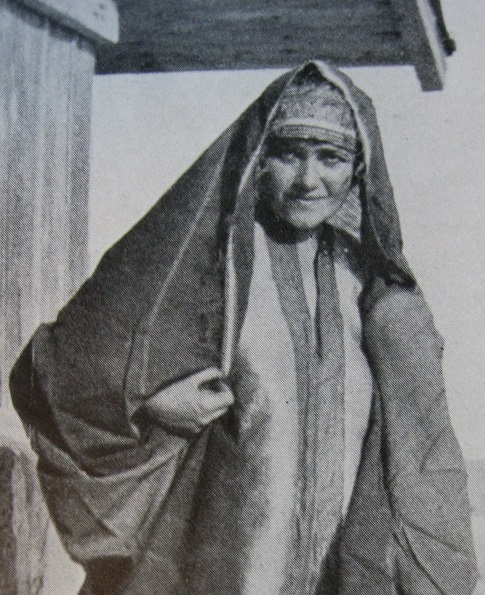
Ida Treat

Ida Treat Bergeret (March 4, 1889 – March 26, 1978) was an American university teacher and paleontologist. She worked as professor at Western Reserve University and Vassar College. During the 1930s and 1940s, she wrote articles and stories for the French and American periodicals such as The Nation, The New Yorker, Harpers, The Saturday Evening Post and Paris Vu. She wrote 17 short stories for The New Yorker from 1941 and 1963.

== Life and career ==
Ida Treat Bergeret was born on March 4, 1889, in Joliet, Illinois, United States. She graduated from Western Reserve University in 1911. She later moved to Paris to earn a doctorate degree in letters from the University of Paris. After graduating in 1913, she returned to Western Reserve University, where she began her professional career in teaching romance languages from 1913 to 1920.

In 1920, she returned to France, where she had 20 years-long career in writing and journalism. She took paleontology courses at the Institute of Human Paleontology and the Museum of Natural History in 1923. Between 1926 and 1930, she earned a second doctorate in paleontology at the Paleontology Research Center in Paris. During the 1930s, while working as a correspondent for Paris Vu, she traveled throughout Europe, China, and the South Pacific.

She also worked as a member of the French Mission of Information in London from 1943 to 1946. In 1948, Bergeret joined the Vassar College as a professor of English.

She retired in 1954.

== Publications ==
- Primitive Hearths in the Pyrenees (1927), an anthropology guide book of Pyrenees region,
- Pearls, Arms and Hashish (1930), first major nonfiction work and
- The Anchored Heart (1941) describes life among the Germans and the French.

== Personal life ==
Bergeret was married three times to Raymond O'Neil, Paul Vaillant-Couturier and André Bergeret.

== Death ==
Bergeret died on March 26, 1978, in Poughkeepsie, New York.
