= George Hoyningen-Huene =

American photographer (1900–1968)

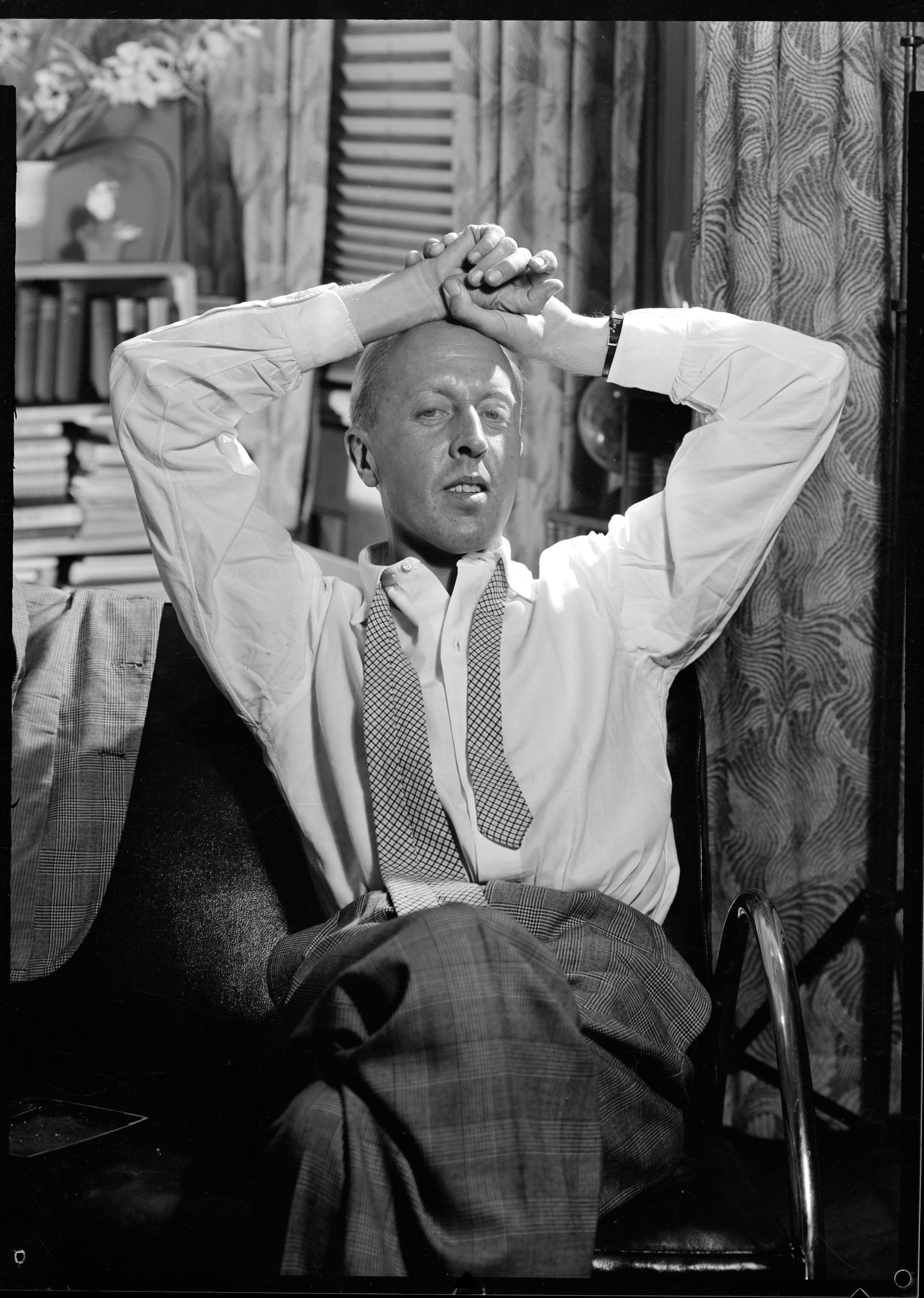
- George Hoyningen-Huene, Sydney, c. 1940
- Born: Baron George Hoyningen-Huene; 4 September 1900; Saint Petersburg, Russia
- Died: 12 September 1968 (aged 68); Los Angeles
- Known for: fashion photography
- Parent(s): Baron Barthold Theodor Hermann (Theodorevitch) von Hoyningen-Huene, Emily Anne "Nan" Lothrop

Baron George Hoyningen-Huene (September 4, 1900 – September 12, 1968) was a fashion photographer of the 1920s and 1930s. He was born in the Russian Empire to Baltic German and American parents and spent his working life in France, England and the United States.

== Europe ==
Born in Saint Petersburg, Russia on September 4, 1900, Hoyningen-Huene was the only son of Baron Barthold Theodor Hermann (Theodorevitch) von Hoyningen-Huene (1859–1942), a Baltic nobleman, military officer and lord of Navesti manor (near Võhma), and his wife, Emily Anne "Nan" Lothrop (1860–1927), a daughter of George Van Ness Lothrop, an American minister to Russia. (The couple was married in Detroit, Michigan, in 1888.) He had two sisters. Helen (died 1976) became a fashion designer in France and the United States, using the name Helen de Huene. Elizabeth (1891–1973), also known as Betty, also became a fashion designer (using the name Mme. Yteb in the 1920s and 1930s).

During the Russian Revolution, the Hoyningen-Huenes fled first to London, and later to Paris. He served as a Sergeant in the British Army during World War One. By 1925 George had already worked his way up to chief of photography of the French Vogue where he was mentored by up-and-coming photographers including François Tuefferd. In 1931 he met Horst, the future photographer, who became his lover and frequent model and traveled to England with him that winter. While there, they visited photographer Cecil Beaton, who was working for the British edition of Vogue. In 1931, Horst began his association with Vogue, publishing his first photograph in the French edition in November of that year.

== United States ==
In 1935 Hoyningen-Huene moved to New York City where he did most of his work for Harper's Bazaar. He published two art books on Greece and Egypt before relocating to Hollywood, where he earned a living by shooting glamorous portraits for the film industry.

Hoyningen-Huene worked in large studios and with whatever lighting worked best. Beyond fashion, he was a portraitist of Hollywood stars and other celebrities.

He also worked in Hollywood in various capacities in the film industry, working closely with George Cukor, notably as special visual and color consultant for the 1954 Judy Garland movie A Star Is Born. He served a similar role for the 1957 film Les Girls, which starred Kay Kendall and Mitzi Gaynor, the Sophia Loren film Heller in Pink Tights, and The Chapman Report.

He died at 68 years of age in Los Angeles.

== Photography ==
- Fashion: As a Chief Photographer of both Vogue and Harper's Bazaar, he photographed brands such as Chanel, Balenciaga, Schiaparelli and Lanvin.
- Portraits: Hoyningen-Huene photographed celebrities, artists, actors, and actresses. These included Johnny Weissmuller, Carole Lombard, Suzy Solidor, Joan Crawford, Gary Cooper, Ava Gardner, Lee Miller, Marlene Dietrich and Cary Grant.
- Nudes: He photographed nudes using the sculpture and architecture of Greece as inspiration.
- Travel: A frequent traveler as part of his fashion photography work, he documented his travels to Greece, Egypt, Tunisia, Algeria and Sudan.

== Publications ==
- Egypt. By Hoyningen-Huene with text by George Steindorff. J. J. Augustin, 1943.
- Hellas: A Tribute to Classical Greece. 64 Photographs by Hoyningen-Huene, with text by Hugh Chisholm. J. J. Augustin, 1943.
- Eye for Elegance – George Hoyningen-Huene. Exhibition catalogue. International Center of Photography and Congreve, 1980.
- The Photographic Art of Hoyningen-Huene. By William Ewing, Hoyningen-Huene. Thames & Hudson, 1998.
- Mexican Heritage. By Hoyningen-Huene, with text by Alfonso Reyes. J.J. Augustin, 1946.
- Baalbek/Palmyra. Photographs by Hoyningen-Huene, with text by David M. Robinson. New York City: J.J. Augustin, 1946.
- Hoyningen-Huene—Meisterbildnesse: Frauen, Mode, Sport, Künstler. With an introduction by H.K. Frenzel. Berlin: Dietrich Reimer, 1932.

== Filmography ==
Film
Year	Title	Role	Notes
1954	The Adventures of Hajji Baba	Color consultant	
1954	A Star Is Born	Special color design advisor	
1956	Bhowani Junction	Color consultant	
1957	Les Girls	Color coordinator	
1960	It Started in Naples	Title designer	
1960	Heller in Pink Tights	Color coordinator and technical advisor	
1960	Let's Make Love	Color coordinator	also known as The Billionaire/The Millionaire
1960	A Breath of Scandal	Costume designer and color advisor	also known as Olympia in Italy
1962	The Chapman Report	Color consultant - designer, title designer	
1963	A New Kind of Love	Color coordinator - designer	
