= Marcel Bovis =

French photographer

Marcel Bovis (1904–1997) was a French photographer, most notable for his photographs of Paris.

Bovis studied at the National School of Decorative Arts in Nice and subsequently arrived to Paris to work as decorator. He taught himself photography and from 1927 started to produce photos of Paris, predominantly at night, and after 1936 became a professional photographer. In the same year, he had his first personal exhibition in Paris. This particular exhibition, which was held in Pavillon de Marsan, was a collection of photos he took together with Pierre Mac Orlan. It records the celebrations of festivals and famous circuses with a humanist sympathy. In 1941 he joined the professional association Le Rectangle and after it disbanded in 1946 he became one of the founding members of the Le Groupe des XV, an association of French photographers, and in 1952, he exhibited at the World Exhibition of Photography in Lucerne.

== Literary work ==
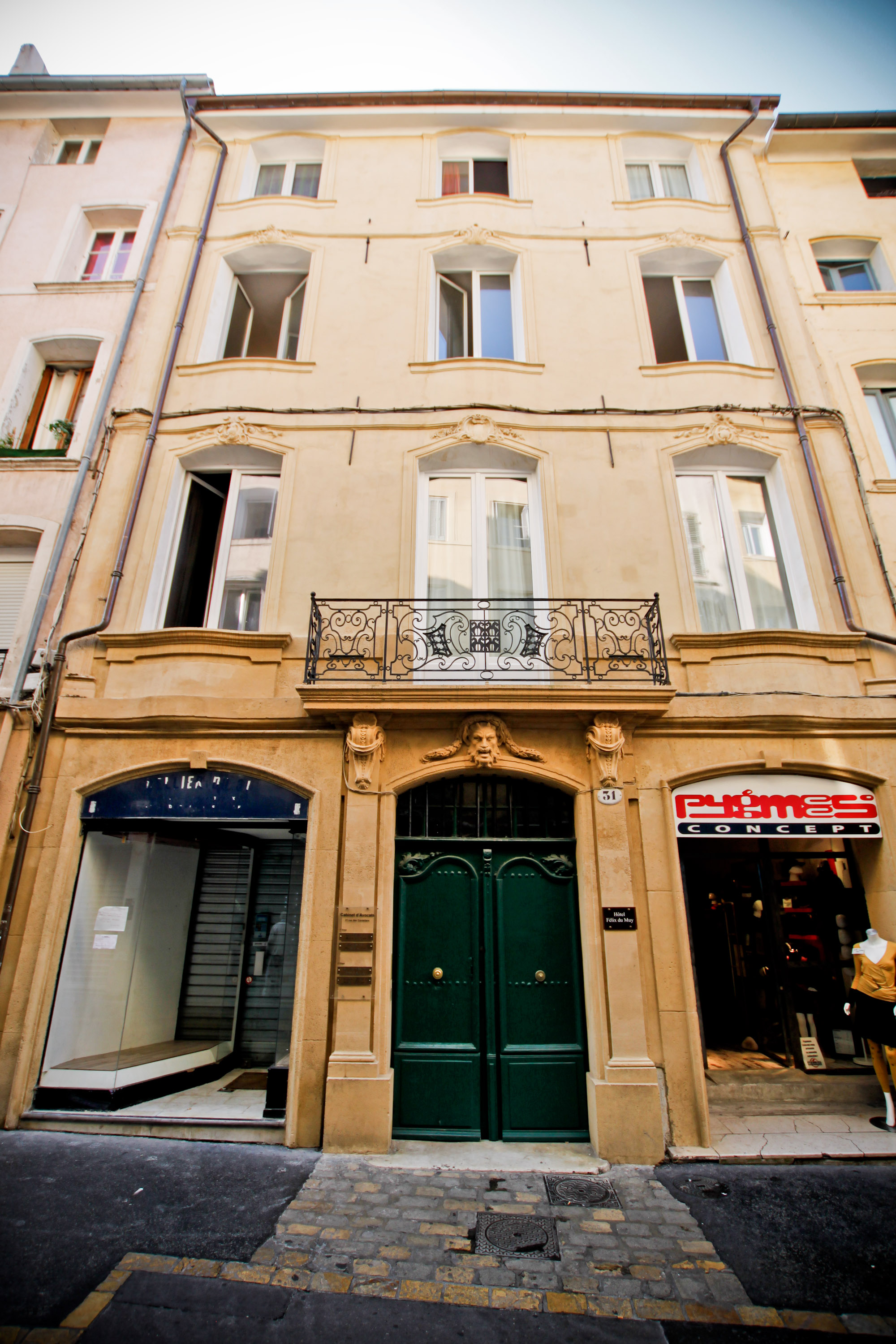
The house in which Bovis had his studio.

In 1941, Bovis co-authored a travel book about Paris with Mac Orlan.

In 1991, Bovis donated over 20,000 of his photographs to the French Government. In 1992, a large retrospective of his works of was shown in the Palais de Tokyo in Paris.

== Books ==
- La Photographie de paysage et d'architecture, Éditions Prisma, Paris, 1948
- Du Quartier latin au Jardin des Plantes, Éditions Arts et métiers graphiques, Paris, 1948
- Initiation à la photographie…, Le Livre de poche, Paris, 1973
- Initiation à la photographie, Éd. universitaire, Paris, 1975
- with Bernard Lefebvre and Maurice Barette, Synopsis: Histoire de la photographie, Recherche et documentation photographiques, Rouen, 1980 LCCN 80-135653
- Bovis 6x6, Michaël Houlette & Mathieu Rivallin, foreword Antonin Pons Braley. Berlin : Tumuult, 2015. (ISBN 978-3-945839-00-3)
