= Vu (magazine) =

VU
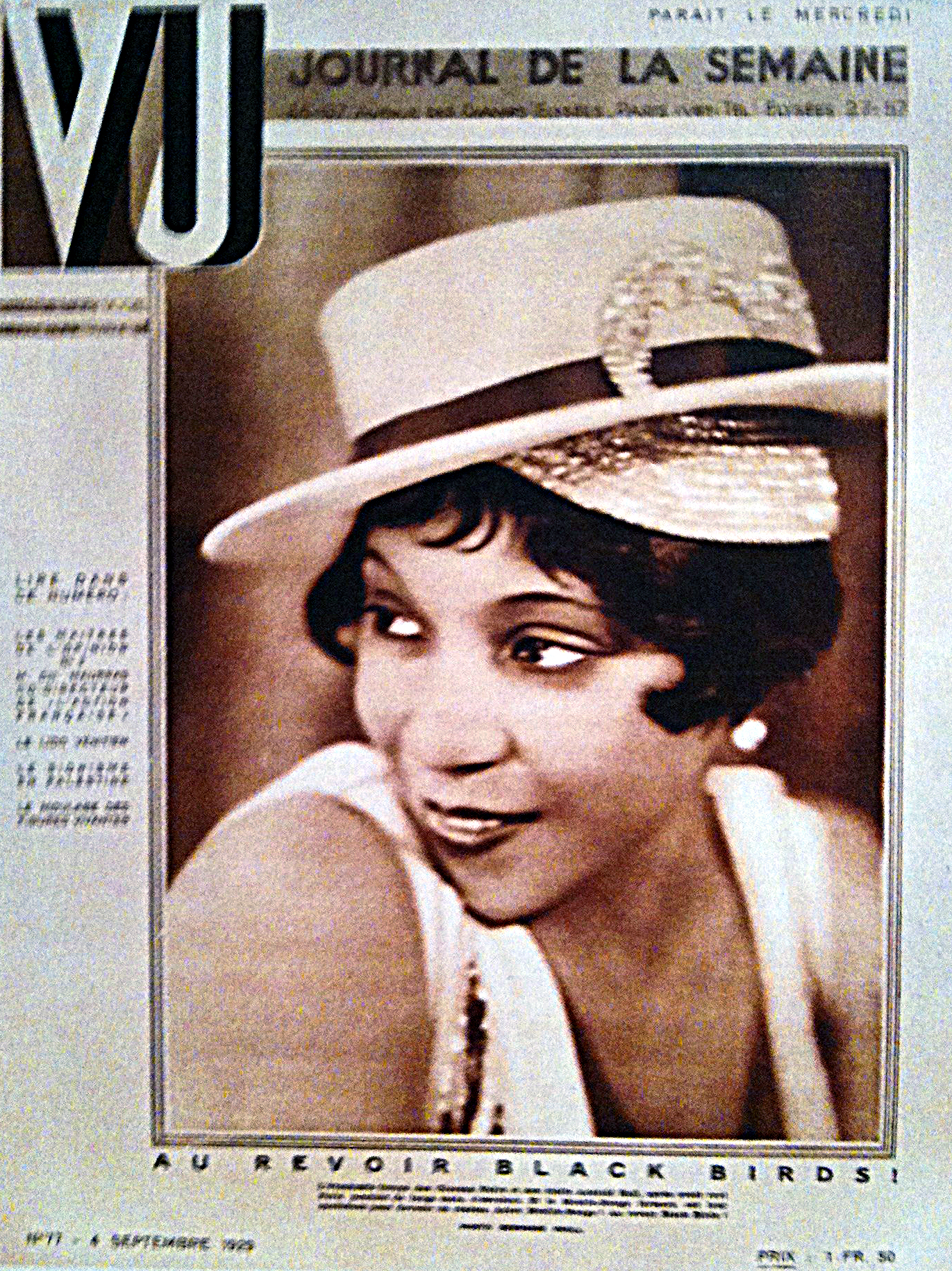
- Vu (magazine) N°77 featuring Adelaide Hall
- Editor: Desfossés - Néogravure1
- Categories: Photojournalism
- Frequency: Weekly
- Founder: Lucien Vogel
- Founded: 1928
- Final issue: 1940
- Based in: Paris, France
- Language: French

Vu, stylized as VU, was a weekly French pictorial magazine, created and directed by Lucien Vogel, which was published from 21 March 1928 to 29 May 1940; it ran for 638 issues.

== History ==
Vu was the first large weekly to systematically feature photographs in essay form, and as such was an important precursor to, and proponent of, the magazine format of photojournalism (which came to prominence a decade after its print run in magazines such as Life and Look).

== Innovation ==
Although inspired in part by the German magazine Berliner Illustrirte Zeitung, VU featured a constructivist aesthetic and was innovative in its layouts, especially in its double-page spreads, in which the layout artists were assisted by rotogravure from film positives of both type and halftone images which could be easily cut and arranged on a light box, rather than using less flexible and more expensive metal halftone blocks.

== Photography ==
Notable contributing photographers included Cartier-Bresson, Man Ray, Brassaï, and André Kertész, but the sole staff photographer was the now lesser-known Gaston Paris 1933-38 who made around 1,300 photos for the magazine. VU was particularly advanced in its use of the picture essay format. Vu encouraged photographers to use the newly available smaller cameras, the medium-format Rolleiflex and 35mm Leica, with faster lenses, high-speed (100 ASA in 1931) roll-film in high-capacity magazines, and rapid operation, facilitated them in producing striking imagery.

== Content ==
The magazine published special issues on the Soviet Union (VU au pays des Soviets, 18 November 1931), which was illustrated by Vogel, himself a keen photographer, on Germany (L'énigme allemande, 1932), the ascent of technology (Fin d'une civilisation, 1933), China (Interrogatoire de la Chine, 1934), and Spain (VU en Espagne, 1936).

In 1931, Vogel founded a companion magazine named Lu (read), a survey of the foreign press translated into French; this merged with Vu in March 1937.

== Legacy ==
A major retrospective was hosted by the Maison Européenne de la Photographie (MEP) in late 2006/early 2007.

== Selected contributors ==
- Ida Treat (née Ida Frances Treat; 1889–1978), correspondent for Vu, 1930 to 1935. She married three times; first, on June 28, 1916, in Cleveland, to Raymond Newton O'Neil (1887–1957); second, October 31, 1923, in Bobigny, to Paul Vaillant-Couturier (1882–1937); and third, on September 30, 1939, André Bergeret (fr) (1904–1966).
- Jean d'Erleigh aka Brassaï (pseudonyms of Gyula Halász; 1899–1994), writer
- André Kertész (1894–1985), photographer
- Man Ray (1890–1976), photographer
- Robert Capa (1913–1954), photographer
- Henri Cartier-Bresson (1908–2004), photographer
- Marie-Claude Vaillant-Couturier (1912–1996), photographer, who, in 1934, married Paul Vaillant-Couturier (1882–1937); she was also the daughter of Lucien Vogel
- Gaston Paris (photographer) (1903–1964), photographer

== See also ==
- Isaac Kitrosser
- Alexander Liberman

== Bibliography ==
=== References ===
- Clark, Josh (19 February 2007) [updated June 13, 2007]. "Vu Magazine: Photos, Robots and Cutting-Edge Design". Big Medium (Blog).
- Mirsky, D.S. (1997). "D. S. Mirsky: Twenty-Two Letters (1926–34) to Salomeya Halpern". In Smith, G.S.; Stone, G.C.; Macrobert, C.M. (eds.). Oxford Slavonic Papers. New Series. Vol. 30. Oxford University Press. pp. 89–122. ISBN 0-1981-5954-4. ISSN 0078-7256. LCCN 52018936. OCLC 1245622914 – via Internet Archive. Mirsky's letter 17, October 20, 1929, from his Gower Street address → "Душенька". pp. 109–110; note 100. For info on Salomeya Halpern (1888–1982), see Mark Slonim.
- Frizot, Michel [in French]; De Veigy, Cédric (2 November 2006). "Regarder Vu: Un Magazine Photographique 1928–1940" [Looking at Vu: A Photographic Magazine, 1928–1940] (in French).
- Heller, Steven; Pomeroy, Karen (1997). "Vogue, Alexander Lieberman". Design Literacy: Understanding Graphic Design. Allworth Press. p. 47. ISBN 978-1-880559-76-5. LCCN 96-79695. OCLC 634624360 – via Internet Archive. LCCN 96-79695
  Supplemental edition:
  Heller, Steven (1999). "Picture Magazines of the 1930s". Design Literacy (continued): Understanding Graphic Design. Allworth Press. p. 65. ISBN 1-5811-5035-0. LCCN 99042995. OCLC 883592407. ("Paris Match was arguably the most popular picture magazine, but the newsweekly Vu ... was the most innovative".)
- Heller, Steve (2009). "Photography Changes the Look and Content of Magazines". Smithsonian Institution. Archived from the original on 27 March 2009.
- Leenaerts, Danielle (2009). "Le Magazine Français Vu (1928–40): Naissance de L'Information Visuelle et Utopie de la Substitution de L'Image Photographique au Texte Écrit" [The French Magazine Vu (1928–40): The Birth of Visual Information and Utopia of the Substitution of Photographic Image for Written Text]. In MacLeod, Catriona; Plesch, Véronique; Schoell-Glass, Charlotte [in German] (eds.). Elective Affinities: Testing Word and Image Relationships. Word & Image Interactions 6 (in French). Amsterdam: Editions Rodopi BV. pp. 159–172. ISBN 978-9-0420-2618-6. OCLC 897034082 – via Google Books.
- Leenaerts, Danielle (2010). Petite Histoire du Magazine Vu (1928–1940): Entre Photographie d'Information et Photographie D'Art [A Brief History of Vu Magazine (1928–1940): Between Information Photography and Art Photography] (in French). Brussels: Presses Interuniversitaires Européennes. p. 115. ISBN 978-9-0520-1585-9. OCLC 690329730 – via Google Books.
- Reiss-Engelhorn-Museen (2019). Gaston Paris: die unersättliche Kamera (in German). Köln: Verlag der Buchhandlung Walther König. ISBN 978-3-96098-569-3. OCLC 1263196302.
