= Pierre Jahan =

French photographer

- Born: 9 September 1909; Ambroise, France
- Died: 21 February 2003 (aged 93); Paris, France
- Occupation: Photographer

Pierre Jahan (9 September 1909 – 21 February 2003) was a French photographer who often worked in a Surrealist style.

== Biography ==
Born in Amboise and introduced to photography by his family at a very early age, Jahan received his first professional commission when he moved to Paris in 1933, through a meeting with ad-man Raymond Gid. In 1936 he joined the Rectangle group of photographers. This group, founded by Emmanuel Sougez, among others, encouraged him in his career as a photographer.

During the Occupation, he worked for the magazine Images de France, making portraits of celebrity figures such as Colette, and he produced large series of pictures such as “La mort et les statues,” published in 1946 with a text by Jean Cocteau. They also co-published a book in which Cocteau's poem "Plain Chant" is illustrated by photographed nudes (1947). In 1956, one of his photographs was selected for the Daily Mirror's Photography Year Book. In 1959, he photographed a Citroën for a creative advertisement. Work by Jahan was featured in a San Francisco gallery show in 1977.

An experimenter with a strong interest in Surrealism, Jahan produced many collages and photomontages, which he used freely for the many advertising commissions that came his way after the end of World War II.

A committed activist for photographers’ rights, he helped to found the professional association Le Rectangle and the French federation of art photographers (FAPC), of which he became vice-chairman. In 1949 he joined the professional photographers' association Le Groupe des XV alongside Robert Doisneau, Willy Ronis, and others, to lobby for the conservation of France's photographic heritage. He took part in their exhibitions and in those held by the Salon National de la Photographie.

He died in Paris in 2003, at age 93.
