= Emmanuel Sougez =

French photographer (1889–1972)

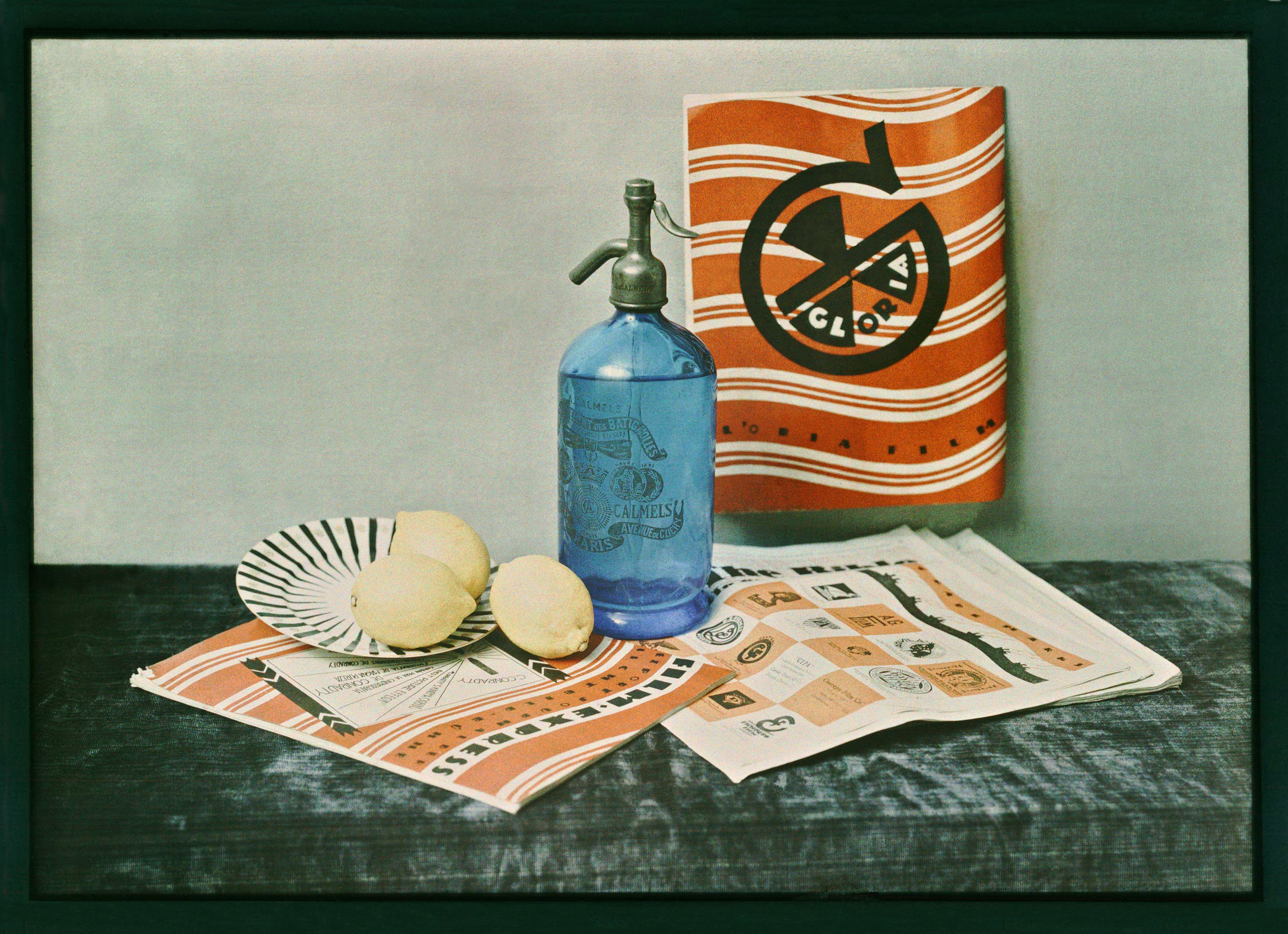
Sougez still life, c. 1926-28

Louis-Victor-Emmanuel Sougez (16 July 1889 – 24 August 1972) was a French photographer.

Sougez was born in Bordeaux, and enrolled at age 15 at the Ecole des Beaux-Arts de Bordeaux, where he studied art, but soon abandoned that to concentrate on photography. From 1905 to 1914, he travelled widely, including Germany, Austria and Switzerland.

After the First World War, became a freelance photographer, based in Paris. There he formed the group 'Le Rectangle' which exhibited modern photography and with some of its members, after the war, helped establish its successor, Le Groupe des XV, then in the 1950s joined Les 30 x 40.

In 1926, Sougez founded the photographic department for the French weekly newspaper, L'Illustration, and promoted the use of colour photography.

Sougez's work is in the permanent collection of the Art Institute of Chicago.
