= Lucien Lorelle =

French portraitist, publicist, humanist photographer, author and painter

Lucien Lorelle (December 29, 1894 – February 26, 1968) was a French portraitist, publicist, humanist photographer, author, painter, a member of Le Groupe des XV and founder of the photography company Central Color.

== Biography ==
Lucien Lorelle, was born on December 29, 1894.

After having voluntarily enlisted, he served in the Infantry and then in the Air Force. He received the Croix de Guerre and the Légion d'honneur.

In 1920 Lorelle found work as the administrator of the Manuel brothers’ art portrait studio, but did not practice photography.

== Professional and artistic photographer ==
In 1927, having taught himself to use a camera, with his brother-in-law Marcel Amson he founded a portrait business, the Studio Lorelle, 47 Boulevard Berthier, Paris, asking Czech Jaroslav Rössler in December to join the enterprise as an advertising photographer just as the latter had planned to migrate to the United States. The German photographer Erna Wagner-Hehmke was also employed there. He sold the studio to Marcel Amson in 1932.

Lorelle opened his own studio in 1935 in rue Lincoln to specialise in advertising photography, and initiated his own Surrealist artistic work incorporating photomontage and collage and frequently the subject of the female nude. When Jean Mauclair opened cinema Studio 28 Lorelle created the poster, and about fifty surrealist images which he presented as a slide show during the intermission of the screening of Luis Buñuel's 1929 Surrealist masterpiece Un Chien Andalou ('An Andalusian Dog').

Advertising campaigns for which he was commissioned included those for L'Oréal's Ambre Solaire, BP, Chanel, Cinzano, Galeries Lafayette (with Cassandre), L'Oreal, Perrier, Pernod (including some posters with Jean Carlu), Philips, SNCF, Teppaz, Winston and Shell. Especially well-known is the advertising Lorelle produced at the end of the 1940s for which the model Suzy Bastide became "Miss Ambre Solaire"; a life-size cut-out of her bikini-clad and tanned body stood at the entrance of the shops and pharmacies of French seaside resorts until the end of the 50s. One of these point-of-sale figurines was lent by L'Oréal to Jean (Yann) Dieuzaide for his Lucien Lorelle tribute exhibition of 1996. Bastide was also the model for some of Lorelle's Surrealist nudes.

A number of artists and celebrities of his time were photographed by Lorelle, including Annabella (1930), Marie Glory (c.1930), Martine Carol, Dominique Wilms, Micheline Presle, Danielle Darrieux, Albert Préjean, Jacqueline Huet, Jean Cocteau, Gérard Philipe, Madeleine Robinson, Madeleine Sologne, Serge Reggiani, Jean Marais, Michel Simon, Jean Gabin, and Michel Galabru.

Lorelle's contributions to the industry were significant; in March 1946, with others, Lorelle founded the professional association Le Groupe des XV, and in 1952 he formed the Paris company Central Color, the first professional colour laboratory in France, now known as Central Dupon Images. He turned it over to his daughter Françoise Gallois, who became president of the Central Color Group, and who married former Brigadier General, novelist and politician, Pierre Gallois. The company also operated in Greenburgh, New York from 1983 to 2001, owned and operated by Lorelle's grandson François Gallois.

== Surrealist photographer ==
From the late 40s Lorelle experimented with Surrealism, especially in his nude studies, and the imagery was sometimes reused in advertising, like his Femme en morceaux in which a statue of a woman lies broken, which was used in a 1948 magazine promotion for Odorono deodorant with the caption; "Un souffle suffit à renverser l'idole" ("One sniff is enough to topple the idol.") His surrealist artistic photography was often combined with drawing, often through an experimental reworking of negatives treated as cliché-verre. He made photomontage and would collage drawings with photographs and write or paint on photographic prints

== Painter, illustrator ==
From 1920 until 1957, photography occupied most of his time, but though he was recognised as a photographer, Lorelle aspired to draw and paint. His literary-inspired works often include superimposed drawings. . Aside from the large number of pen drawings in his personal archives are a few of his paintings that he had not destroyed. He regularly participated as an artist and sometimes as President at major exhibitions.

== Author ==
After 1958 Lorelle devoted himself to writing books on colour photography and photography of the nude, with translations into German, English and Spanish and published by Paul Montel. His lecture The ABC of photography was published by Linguaphone.

== Legacy ==
On February 26, 1968 Lucien Lorelle died in Megève, leaving a body of photographic negatives, paintings, drawings, montages and innumerable texts as well as many books dealing with photography in its technical and artistic aspects.

== Publications ==
- Galerie municipale du château d'eau. (1996). Lucien Lorelle, 1894-1968: Toulouse-Place Laganne, janvier 1996. Toulouse: Galerie municipale du château d'eau.
- Lorelle, L., Bouqueret, C., & Galerie Bouqueret + Lebon. (1992). Lucien Lorelle. Paris: Galerie Bouqueret + Lebon.
- Lorelle, L., Lucien Lorelle (1894-1968), Bièvres., & Musée Francaise de la Photographie, Bièvres. (1979). Lucien Lorelle: (1894-1968), 15. Februar - 10. April 1979, Musée Francaise de la Photographie, Bièvres. Bievres.
- Lorelle, L. (1977). Le Guide du photographe amateur. Paris: P. Montel.
- Lorelle, L. (Lucien) (1964), Esthétique du nu dans le monde, P. Montel
- Mariel, P., Lorelle, L., & Collection Viollet (Paris). (1965). Die Schönen von Paris: Quartier latin und St. Germain-des-Prés. Bonn: Verlag der europäischen Bücherei H. M. Hieronimi.
- Lorelle, L. (1964). La pratique des optima. Paris: P. Montel.
- Lorelle, L., & Sonntag, W. (1963). Akt-Auslese: Ein Querschnitt durch d. internationale Aktfotografie d. Gegenwart. Bonn: Verl. d. Europäischen Bücherei Hieronimi.
- Lorelle, L. (1962). L'art du portrait photographique: Noir-et-blanc et couleur. Avec 223 portraites et dessins de l'auteur. Paris: P. Montel.
- Cain, J., & Lorelle, L. (1961). Salon international du portrait photographique. Paris: Bibliothèque nationale.
- Lorelle, L. (Lucien) (1960), Photos et propos sur le nu, P. Montel
- Lorelle, Lucien (1956), The colour book of photography (3rd ed.), Focal press
- Lorelle, L. (Lucien) (1951), Le livre de la couleur directe : pour les photographes et les cinéastes, P. Montel
- Lorelle, L. (1950). Le portrait photographique. Paris: Publications Photo-cinéma Paul Montel.
- Lorelle, L., & Langelaan, D. (1949). La photographie publicitaire. Paris: Publications Paul Montel.
- Fraigneau, A., Lorelle, L., Audiat, P., Fernandez, R., Boutillier, . R. A., Gallois, A., & Agence française d'information de presse. (1932). [Recueil. Dossiers biographiques Boutillier du Retail. Documentation sur Jean Blanzat]. ([Recueil. Dossiers biographiques Boutillier du Retail. Coupures de presse relatives à des personnalités françaises et étrangères].) Paris: Le figaro.
- Schmitt, F., Brillant, M., Schneider, L., Samazeuilh, G., Lafollye, J., Chauvet, L., Lorelle, L., ... Boutillier, . R. A. (1924). [Recueil. Dossiers biographiques Boutillier du Retail. Documentation sur Jacques Ibert]. ([Recueil. Dossiers biographiques Boutillier du Retail. Coupures de presse relatives à des personnalités françaises et étrangères].) Paris: La revue de France.

== Exhibitions ==
- 2018: Né(e)s de l’Écume et des Rêves, MUMA, Le Havre, May 5—Sep 9
- 2012/13: Voici Paris - Modernités photographiques, 1920-1950, Centre Pompidou, Paris, Oct 17–Jan 14
- 2012: Regards sur le Corps, Les Baux de Provence, 12ème Festival Européen de la Photo de Nu, May 12–20
- 2012: Imaginaire et illusion, Le Château d’Eau, Toulouse (Galerie 2), 1 Place Laganne, Toulouse, Jan 4–Mar 4
- 2011/12: Du jeu dans le je, Hôtel Fontfreyde Centre photographique, 34 rue des Gras, Clermont-Ferrand, Dec 15–Mar 3
- 2009: Sabotage de la Réalité, Musée de la Fondation Amparo, Mexico, Jun 12–Aug 31
- 2009: Regards et Dissimulations: Arcimboldo de Lucien Lorelle, Muséo de Arte Moderna de São Paulo, Brazil, Apr 23–Jun 28
- 2008: Lucien Lorelle, Peintre de Lumière, Médiathèque Jacques Baumel, Sep 2–Oct 4
- 2007/8: Paris en couleurs, des frères Lumières à Martin Parr de 1907 à nos jours, Hôtel de Ville de Paris, salle Saint Jean, Dec 4–Mar 31
- 2008: Rétrospective Lucien Lorelle, l’Espace Trois Petits Poings: 50 B&W photographs 1920–1960, drawings, books and other documents, sale of limited edition photographs, in partnership with Central Color, Paris, to Mar 8
- 2006/7: La photographie publicitaire en France, Musée de la Publicité, 107 rue de Rivoli, Paris, Nov 8–Mar 25
- 2006/7: Photographes Humanistes, BnF, Oct 31–Jan 27
- 2006: Lucien Lorelle : Photographe, Rueil-Malmaison, Sep 9
- 2006: Rencontres d’Arles 2006, Jul 4–Sep 17
- 1998: 10th Rencontres Photographiques du Pays Voironnais, Villa des Arts, 169 rue de Charnècle, Voreppe, May 25–Jun 14
- 1998: Lucien Lorelle, Central Color, 10 rue Pergolèse, Paris, Jun 24–Sep 15
- 1996: Lucien Lorelle, Galerie du Château d’Eau, Château Laganne, 1 Place Charles Laganne, Toulouse, Jan 17–Feb 11
- 1992: Lucien Lorelle. Galerie Bouqueret + Lebon, Paris
- 1990/1 Photographies : De la réclame à la publicité, Galerie du Forum - Centre Georges Pompidou, Paris, Oct 31–Jan 6
- 1988: Une exposition de photographies françaises à New York en 1948, Galerie du Forum, Centre Georges Pompidou, Paris, Sep 21–Nov 21
- 1982/3: Paris 1950 photographié par le Groupe des XV, Bibliothèque historique de la ville de Paris, 22, rue Malher, Paris, Nov 5–Jan 29
- 1979: Lucien Lorelle, Musée Français de la Photographie, 78 rue de Paris, Bièvres, Feb 15–Apr 10
- 1962: Photographies publicitaires et d’illustrations pour des oeuvres littéraires, Galerie de la Société Française de Photographie, 9 rue Montalembert, Paris, Dec 4–31

== Bibliography ==
- Gautrand, Jean-Claude, 'Lucien Lorelle, le charme de l'avant-garde'. In : Réponses Photo, n° 42, May 2012, pp. 82–89.
- Masclet, Daniel, 'Lucien Lorelle, photographe'. In : Photo-Ciné-Revue, April 1968, pp. 192–193.
