= Philippe Pottier (photographer) =

French photographer (1905–1991)

Philippe Pottier (1905 – 1991) was a French photographer, who primarily produced fashion photography. Pottier is an important figure in the development of humanist photography.

Pottier was born in 1905 to René Maurice and Marie-Thérèse. His father and uncle were owners of the Aux Trois Quartiers department store, inherited from their father. René and Marie-Thérèse rented their apartment to Ernest Hemingway and Pauline Pfeiffer in 1927. Pottier became a member of the Shakespere and Company lending library of Sylvia Beach in 1926.

Pottier began his career as a photographer in 1934, he was a founding member of the influential Le Rectangle photography association (1936 to 1946). Pottier also joined the associations successor Le Groupe des XV (1946 to 1957) and exhibited annually with both associations. In the early 1940s he worked for Silhouettes. Then joining Elle, leaving the publication in the late 1940s after they refused his request to work as an editor. Pottier then joined L'Officiel as a fashion editor and photographer, working exclusively for the magazine. Part of Pottier's archive from 1948 to 1963 was digitised for the Bibliothèque nationale de France in 2015.

== Exhibitions ==
- Le Rectangle, Exposition Internationale des Arts et Techniques dans la Vie Moderne, Paris (25 May–25 November, 1937)
- Le Rectangle, Salon National de la Photographie, Paris (25 January–10 February, 1938)
- Le Rectangle, (28 April–15 May, 1939)
- Le Rectangle, l'Exposition Nationale Artisanale, Union centrale des Arts décoratifs, Paris (4 December 1942–17 January 1943)
- Le Groupe des XV, Salon National de la Photographie, Paris (29 May–22 June, 1946)
