= Laure Albin Guillot =

French photographer (1879–1962)

- Born: Laure Maffredi; 15 February 1879; Paris, France
- Died: 22 February 1962 (aged 83); Paris, France
- Known for: Photography
- Awards: Gold medal, Revue française de photographie (1922)

Laure Albin Guillot (née Maffredi; 15 February 1879 – 22 February 1962) was a French photographer. In addition to portraits of Paris celebrities, she covered a wide variety of genres and had a number of high-ranking positions.

== Early life ==
Born Laure Maffredi in Paris, she attended the Lycée Molière in the 16th arrondissement. In 1897 she married Dr. Albin Guillot, a specialist in microscopy.

== Career ==
Working from her studio at her home on Rue du Ranelagh, she published her first fashion photographs in the French edition of Vogue in 1922. The same year, she won a gold medal in a contest sponsored by Revue Francaise de Photographie. From 1924 to 1950, she exhibited regularly at the Salon international de photographie and at the Salon des artistes décorateurs. She had her first one-person exhibition with forty prints at the Paris Salon d'Automne in 1925. The works she exhibited at the 1925 International Exposition of Modern Industrial and Decorative Arts were signed Laure Albin Guillot, paving her way to celebrity.

After her husband died in 1929, she moved to Boulevard de Beauséjour where she received the artistic celebrities of the day including Paul Valéry, Colette, Anna de Noailles and Jean Cocteau. In the course of the 1930s, she travelled widely to North Africa, Spain, Italy, Sweden and the United States. Her work was frequently published in the press while she participated in solo and collective exhibitions at home and abroad.

In 1931, she was the first in France to photograph decorative microscopic images which she called "micrographie", combining science with visual art. The same year, she became president of the Union féminine des carrières libérales et commerciales, an organisation bent on supporting the interests of women in professional life. In 1932, she was appointed head of a number of key bodies, including the director of photographic archives for the Direction générale des Beaux-Arts, the first curator of the Cinémathèque nationale.

The first of her works combining photography with literature was published in 1936 when she illustrated Paul Valéry's Narcisse, publishing further works from 1940 to 1944 during the German occupation. In 1937, she helped to organise the exhibition Les femmes artistes d'Europe.

After the Second World War, Albin Guillot continued to work as a portraitist at her studio on the Boulevard du Séjour until she retired in 1956 to the Maison Nationale des Artistes in Nogent-sur-Marne.

== Artistic style ==
Laure Albin Guillot exhibited in the 1920s, adopting a classical approach or French style rather than the avant-garde trends of the day. But it was in the 1930s and 1940s that her work dominated the photographic scene. She covered a variety of genres, everything from portraits and nudes to landscapes, still lifes and, to a lesser extent, journalism. A master of technology, she made use of the very latest methods of image production, perfectly suited to the requirements of publication.

== Death and legacy ==
She died at the Hôpital Saint-Antoine in Paris on 22 February 1962. Her studio archive, comprising 52,000 negatives and 20,000 prints, now belongs to the city of Paris.

== Illustrated works ==
Laure Albin Guillot illustrated the following works:

- Paul Valéry: Narcisse (1936)
- Paul Valéry: La Cantate du Narcisse (1941)
- Paul Valéry: Arbres (1943)
- Pierre Louÿs: Les Douze Chansons de Bilitis (1937)
- Henry de Montherlant: La Déesse Cypris (1946)
- Illustrations pour les Préludes de Claude Debussy (1948)

== Exhibitions ==
- Laure Albin Guillot (1879–1962) l'enjeu classique, 26 February – 12 May 2013, Jeu de Paume, Paris
- Guillot's work was included in the 2021 exhibition Women in Abstraction at the Centre Pompidou.

== Awards ==
- 1922: Médaille d'or (gold medal), Revue française de photographie.

== Literature ==
- Guillot, Laure Albin; Bouqueret, Christian; d'Evreux, Musée; Capitou, Centre d'art contemporain, Musée Sainte-Croix (1996). Laure Albin Guillot, ou, La volonté d'art (in French). Marval. ISBN 978-2-86234-213-9.
- Guillot, Laure Albin (2013), l'enjeu classique, preface: Marta Gili; text: Delphine Desveaux, Catherine Gonnard, Michaël Houlette and Patrick‑Gilles Persin, bilingual French/English, published jointly by Jeu de Paume and Éditions de la Martinière, 192 pages ISBN 978-2-7324-5514-3
