= John Berndt =

American musician

John Berndt (born 1967) is a musician and organizer based in Baltimore, Maryland who is best known as an extended-technique experimental saxophonist and electronic musician. He participated in the second wave of the neoism cultural movement, the first wave having consisted of Monty Cantsin, Istvan Kantor, and Blaster Al Ackerman, amongst many others. Berndt's participation in Neoism began after the 1st eight Neoist Apartment Festivals (1980 to 1984) during the "64th International Neoist Apartment Festival" in 1986 in Berlin and subsequently in the "One Millionth" in New York City in late 1988 and the "13th" in Paris in 1994. Conceptual work by Berndt was shown at Documenta X, in Kassel, in 1997.

As the founder of, and a member of the Red Room—a collective of artists and improvising musicians operating much in the spirit of the Los Angeles Free Music Society that is now called The High Zero Foundation—-Berndt co-curates the Red Room experimental performance series, which has presented weekly events since 1996, as well as the High Zero Festival of Experimental Improvised Music, a large annual improvised music festival begun in 1999 in Baltimore known for its qualification that improvising performers play in ad hoc groups organized specifically for the festival.

This group became a 501(c)3 nonprofit organization, High Zero Foundation, in 2001.

Berndt is the musical creator of the "Relabi" style, an approach to rhythm which suggests but ultimately denies a stable, regular pulse. He is also director of the Afro-Germanicist ensemble Multiphonic Choir, Second Nature improvising orchestra, and performance-art group Geodesic Gnome.

In 2009, The Emily Harvey Foundation in NYC held a retrospective show of Berndt's visual, language, audio and installation work. A festival of Berndt's music including collaborations with Elliott Sharp, Peter Zummo, Katt Hernandez, and Second Nature was held concurrently.

Berndt runs the "Recorded" record label which has issued twenty-five CDs of experimental music, including four discs by Berndt's collaborator Henry Flynt. Recorded was the first CD publisher of the music of Henry Flynt on CD, issuing four CDs of his music to date.

== Discography ==
The Recordings, Recorded, 1994
That Nothing Is Known (Quartet Improvisations), Recorded, 1998
The Hermeneutic Ubermenschen... Sing! (Thus), Field Recordings, 2001
In A Human Mood, Field Recordings 2002
The Montreal Concert, Stereosupremo (Italy), 2002
Tripod Mind (THUS), Recorded, 2005
Portzeibe (THUS), Recorded, 2006
Occupation: 1980-1990, Heresee, 2007
The Private Language Problem, Abstract on Black, 2008
New Logic for Old Saxophones, Creative Sources Recordings, 2011

== Book References ==
A Neoist Research Project N.O. Cantsin, OpenMute, 2010
Oliver Marchart Neoismus Edition Selene, Wien, 1997, S. 16
THE ASSAULT ON CULTURE: UTOPIAN CURRENTS FROM LETTRISM TO CLASS WAR by Stewart Home.
Ist edition Aporia Press and Unpopular Books, London 1988. 2nd UK edition AK Press, 1991.
NEOISM, PLAGIARISM & PRAXIS by Stewart Home. AK Press, London & Edinburgh 1995
Plagiarism: Art As Commodity and Strategies for Its Negation, Stewart Home, AK Press, London, 1987
How to Write a Résumé - Volume II: Making a Good First Impression (1st edition), tENTATIVELY, a cONVENIENCE, Apathy Press, Baltimore, 1989
