= The Seven by Nine Squares =

Online art project

The Seven By Nine Squares was an early internet site, and art project, led by Florian Cramer. It was designed as an interactive literary experience, and speaks primarily of the concepts of Neoism, collective identity, and Monty Cantsin.

Stewart Home, co-writer of book The House of Nine Squares, with Florian Cramer, asserts that the project was an effort to create the illusion of an art movement. Where Neoism, for the authors, is nothing more than an idea than even they disagreed upon. Both felt it was a "movement" defined by those that used the term, and how. Their efforts simply served to elevate the idea of the existence of this movement, with the purpose of confusing all.

Published letters, from 1995, between the two, reveal the names 'Luther Blissett,' 'Monty Cantsin,' and 'Karen Eliot,' were used widely throughout the media at the time, by many different people, in assistance with building the myth. Anonymity and the shared usage of names was a core concept of so-called Neoism.

It was rated by Point Survey, in the 1990s, as being among the top 5% of all sites in the Internet, and "Web of the Week" by Steinkrug Publications.

"In 1994, hundreds of European artists, activists and pranksters adopted and shared the same identity. They all called themselves Luther Blissett and set to raising hell in the cultural industry. It was a five-year plan. They worked together to tell the world a great story, create a legend, give birth to a new kind of folk hero."
