= Unpopular Books =

Publisher in the East End of London

Unpopular Books is a publisher in London's East End, producing leaflets, pamphlets, and books.

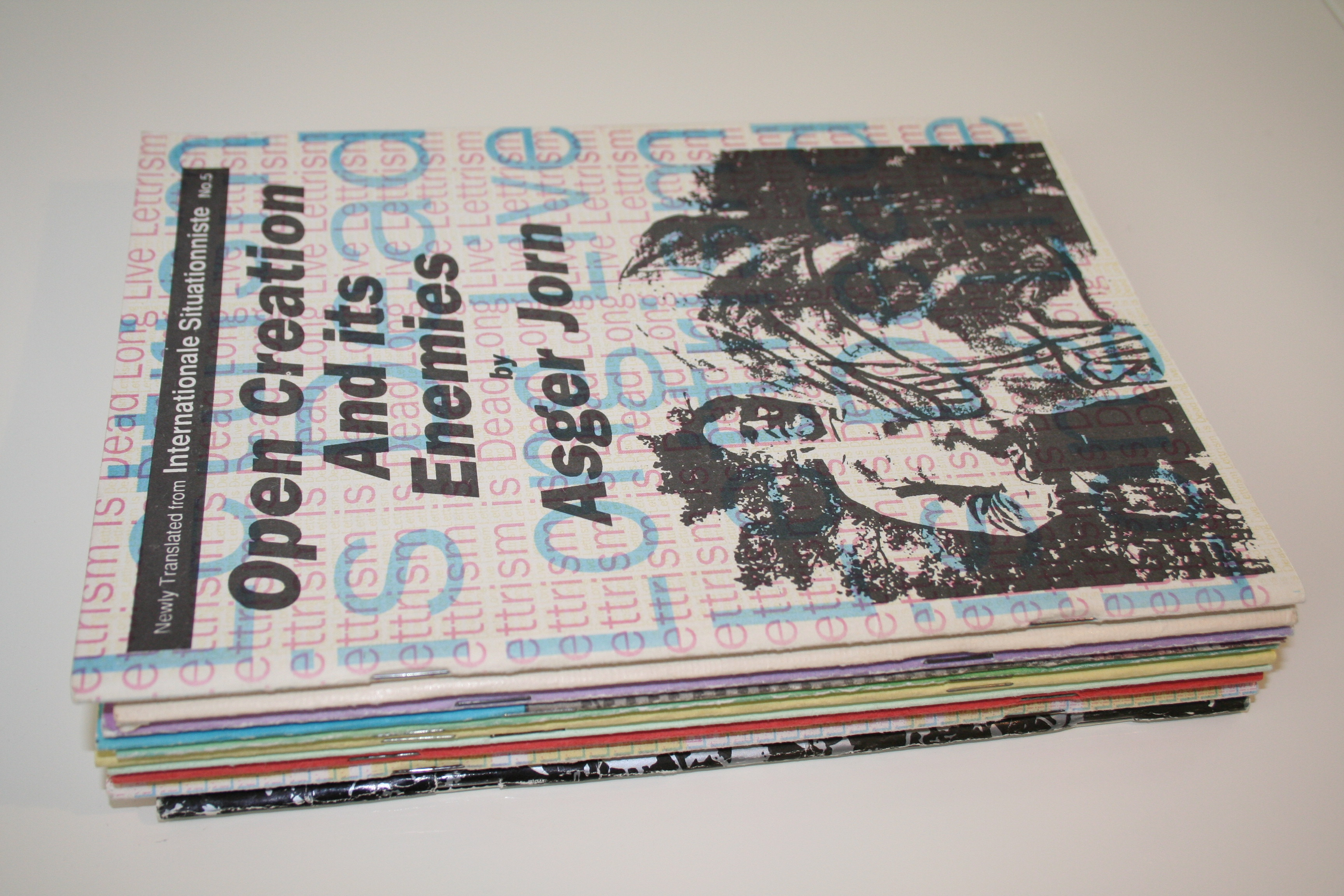
Pamphlets by Unpopular Books

== Published work ==
=== Leaflets, pamphlets and booklets ===
- Jean Barrot - What is Communism (1984)
- Jean Barrot - Fascism/Antifascism
- Jean Barrot - What is Situationism (1986)
- Ruins of Glamour, Glamour of Ruins (1986)
- Jacques Camatte - The Echo of Time (1988)
- Alan Cohen - Decadence of the Shamans: Or Shamanism as a Key to the Secrets of Communism (1992) ISBN 1-871593-00-X
- Class Struggle in a German Town by Temp workers on the construction site of the nuclear power plant Philippsburg
- London Psychogeographical Association and the Archaeogeodetic Association - The Great Conjunction: The Symbols of a College, the Death of a King and the Maze on the Hill (1993) ISBN 1-871593-05-0
- Asger Jorn - Open Creation and its Enemies (1994) ISBN 1-871593-20-4
- Luther Blissett & Stewart Home - Green Apocalypse (1995). OCLC 34118206 (See also )
- Luther Blissett - Militias - Rooted in White Supremacy (1997)
- Richard Essex (ed.) - The Revolution is Not a Masonic Affair (1997)
- Ivan Chtcheglov - Formulary for a New Urbanism
- Jean Barrot - ‘’Fugitive Father’’ (1998)
- Escaping a paranoid cult: A selection of texts from the 1981 splits unmasking the ICC's Stalinist fabrications against Chenier (1999)

=== Books ===
- Stewart Home - The Assault on Culture: Utopian currents from Lettrisme to Class War (published with Aporia Press, 1988) ISBN 0-948518-88-X
- Anonymous - Black Mask & Up Against the Wall Motherfuckers - The incomplete works of Ron Hahne, Ben Morea, and the Black Mask Group (1993) ISBN 1-873176-70-8
- James Carr - Bad - an autobiography (published with Pelegian Press, 1995)
- Daniel Lux - Camden Parasites (1999) ISBN 1-871593-21-2

== See also ==
- Unpopular Books
- Unpopular Books material at Libcom
