= Berg (novel) =

1964 book by Ann Quin

- First edition (publ. Calder Publishing)
- Author: Ann Quin
- Language: English
- Publisher: Calder Publishing
- Publication date: 1964
- LC Class: PZ4.Q73 Be

Berg (1964) was the first novel by the British experimental writer Ann Quin.

== Writing and publication ==
Quin wrote the novel while working as a secretary. She then had a nervous breakdown, suffering from hallucinations, but received treatment from a psychiatrist and soon after she recovered, the novel was accepted by publisher John Calder. Calder was a leading figure of the literary avant-garde of the time, publishing Samuel Beckett, Alexander Trocchi, William S. Burroughs, and others.

It slipped out of print in the 1970s, before being reissued by Dalkey in 2001.

== Plot and style ==
A man called Berg, who changed his name to Greb, came to a seaside town intending to kill his father...

— Ann Quin, Berg

Above are the book's first lines, which have been called one of the greatest openings of any book. Berg is set in the English seaside town of Brighton, which was also where Quin grew up, and her home for most of her life, until her death by suicide in 1973; the action takes place in winter when the resort was empty and desolately atmospheric. The plot has echoes of Oedipus and Freudian theory, involving a romantic triangle between a man, his father, and the father's mistress Judith. The son attempts to murder the father, but ends up mutilating a ventriloquist's dummy and dragging it around town convinced it is his father's corpse. Events are resolved with an almost circular ending.

The novel is written in a kind of internal monologue by Berg/Greb, which mingles description, speech, and thoughts, without clearly distinguishing them, and filtering everything through the central character's viewpoint. Much of the novel takes place under the influence of alcohol, which adds to the confusing, dream-like atmosphere. However, Quin also includes elements of British spy fiction and the crime novel, in the melodramatic way the son stakes out his father's flat and tries to kill the old man; Giles Gordon detected the influence of Graham Greene.

== Reception ==
Upon release, Berg received considerable attention from reviewers. John Coleman gave it a mixed review in The Guardian, finding an "unusual, rather funny story" hidden beneath Quin's challenging prose, which he criticised for "self-indulgence" but praised for her descriptions and brutal dialogue. Mary Conroy in the Sunday Times called it "Beckett minus his humour and variety"; although she found the childhood scenes vivid, she complained about Quin's recourse to sexual violence and the confusing style.

More recently Berg has been praised for introducing to British fiction the techniques of the European experimental novel, the nouveau roman of Alain Robbe-Grillet and Nathalie Sarraute. However at the time of Berg, it is not clear if Quin had read any of their writing. Writer Lee Rourke has variously called it "one of the great British novels", "beautiful", "dark, esoteric, haunting", and "the best novel ever set in Brighton".

While critics have bemoaned Berg's lack of influence on later British literature, it did have some followers, inspiring works such as Stewart Home's experimental novel 69 Things to Do with a Dead Princess.

== Movie ==
Berg was adapted into the 1989 film Killing Dad, written and directed by Michael Austin and starring Richard E Grant as the son, Denholm Elliott as the father, and Julie Walters as the mistress, Judith. The Times commented "nothing is funny" but predicted "better things beckon" for Austin. Time Out was also critical, saying Austin's "caricatures go through the motions of an Oedipal murder plot in perfunctory fashion", and complaining about the lack of compassion. Walters' and Elliotts' performances were praised, though Grant was less impressive due to an odd wig and unconvincing accent.
