= 69 Things to Do with a Dead Princess =

Book by Stewart Home

- Author: Stewart Home
- Genre: Fiction
- Published: 8 May 2002 (Canongate)
- Publication place: United Kingdom
- Pages: 182
- ISBN: 9781841953816

69 Things to Do with a Dead Princess is an experimental novel by the British writer Stewart Home, first published by Canongate in 2002. It tells the story of a suicidal man investigating a conspiracy theory about the death of Diana, Princess of Wales, with much explicit sex and philosophical discussions, and was positively reviewed by The Times and the London Review of Books.

== Plot ==
Following epigraphs from Karl Marx and Samuel Taylor Coleridge, the novel tells the story of a man, variously called Callum or Alan, who is planning to kill himself. He has relocated to Aberdeen in the northeast of Scotland, where he befriends Anna Noon, a female student at Aberdeen University who also acts as the novel's narrator. They discuss literature and philosophy. Callum/Alan has a large collection of books he is attempting to read, including the fictional 69 Things to Do with a Dead Princess by the fictional cult writer K.L. Callan, which contains a conspiracy theory about the death of Diana, Princess of Wales. Callan's book claims that Diana was murdered then her corpse was dragged around Scottish stone circles until it fell apart, and Callum/Alan decides to test this by repeating the process with a ventriloquist's dummy. The novel contains extensive descriptions of Aberdeen and nearby parts of Scotland. About a third of the novel is pornographic sex scenes.

== Influences ==
The book draws on 1960s-70s experimental novelist Ann Quin, particularly her seaside novel Berg. Home claimed the book was "influenced by literary Modernism and recent continental philosophy". The Times identified attacks on literary figures including Michael Bracewell, Robert McCrum, and W. G. Sebald.

== Reception ==
It was reviewed at length in the London Review of Books by the Aberdonian writer Jenny Turner, who said, "I really don't think anyone who is at all interested in the study of literature has any business not knowing the work of Stewart Home." In a favourable review, she noted many of Home's usual preoccupations including sex, philosophy, and settling petty grudges, but also a good knowledge of Aberdeen and a surprising absence of skinheads.

Tim Teeman in the Times found "much to engage the reader", including atmospheric and detailed descriptions, and the clever way Home plays with characters' identities: despite the book's weaknesses, Home is "so rude, nasty, funny and weird" that it works. For the same paper, David Mattin found it "mesmerising, affecting and powerful".

Publishers Weekly described it as a "fusion of highbrow theory and pulp pornography"; their critic found it "occasionally tedious" but OK for fans of Kathy Acker or Robert Coover.
