= Blaster Al Ackerman =

American mail artist and writer

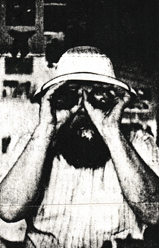
- Photo of Ackerman which he shared with interviewer Chaw Mank circa 1982
- Born: William Hogg Greathouse Jr. November 27, 1939
- Died: March 17, 2013 (aged 73); Austin, Texas, U.S.
- Occupations: Mail artist, writer
- Spouse: Patty (m. 1971, divorced)
- Children: 1

Blaster Al Ackerman (born William Hogg Greathouse Jr.; November 27, 1939 – March 17, 2013) was an American mail artist and writer. Ackerman had been active in a number of subcultures since the early 1970s.

Influenced by pulp writers like Clark Ashton Smith, H.P. Lovecraft, Theodore Sturgeon, Raymond Chandler, Philip K. Dick, and Fredric Brown (with whom Ackerman corresponded as a young person) as well as by modernists like Paul Valéry, Ray Johnson, Francis Ponge and the Oulipo, the name Al Ackerman is a pseudonym most likely alluding to the science fiction editor and collector Forrest J. Ackerman.

Al Ackerman's writing, including poetry and short stories, has dealt playfully, if obsessively, with themes of madness and weird phenomena. His visual work is also in the tradition of black humor, often including a trademark character, the hebephrenic, with a wide upper lip and two protruding teeth.

He self-published several zines, including The Laughing Postman, Moonhead News, The Waverly Flea, and Ask Ling, this last featuring his parody pulp hero the Ling Master. His voluminous mail art output was anthologized in The Blaster Omnibus in 1994, and given a one-man show at the Chela Gallery in Baltimore, Maryland in the early 21st century. Other books include Let Me Eat Massive Pieces of Clay, I Taught My Dog to Shoot a Gun, and Corn and Smoke. In the last twenty years of his life, he was mostly frequently published in The Lost and Found Times, published by frequent collaborator John M. Bennett, Popular Reality, published by Susan Poe (Irrev. Crowbar), and in the Shattered Wig Review published by Rupert Wondolowski. However, his massive body of work is difficult to track due to his regular use of a variety of pseudonyms (which he relates to his childhood love of pulp fiction), including Eel Leonard, Luther Blissett (a reference to the footballer of the same name), and Swarthy Turk Sellers among many others, as well as regular anonymous and collaborative works.

His influence in the 1980s was strongly felt by neoism founder Istvan Kantor, performance artist Andre Stitt, photographer Richard Kern (who published Ackerman's writing in his magazine Dumb Fucker) and musician Genesis P-Orridge who used one of Ackerman's letters as the text of Throbbing Gristle's song "Hamburger Lady." Many of his stories have been made into videos by Steve "Sleeze" Steele, and one, about a man who gives his life over to the creation of a garment made of Vienna sausages, was given half-hour-length film treatment by Chet Pancake under the title The Suit. In 2005 a long playing record of his spoken performances, titled I Am Drunk, was issued. His latest book entitled Misto Peas: Tiny Special Stories, was published in 2009 by Luna Bisonte Productions. The book contains rewordings or "hacks" of poet John M. Bennett's writing. He read from this new book at Shattered Wig Nite hosted by Rupert Wondolowski at Baltimore's 14 Karat Cabaret in November 2009. He was a frequent contributor to the Shattered Wig series of performances and publications.

== Personal life ==
In 1971 he married Patty. Their daughter Stephanie was born in 1972. Later, Blaster and Patty divorced.

He died in Austin, Texas in 2013.
