= Multiple-use name =

Name used by many different people to protect anonymity

A multiple-use name or anonymity pseudonym is a name used by many different people to protect anonymity.

One of the first modern multiple-use names was Nicolas Bourbaki, used by a group of French mathematicians associated with the École Normale Supérieure from 1935 onwards to exemplify the collective effort that goes into mathematics.

The name Alan Smithee has been in use in Hollywood since 1968 by directors who wish to disavow creative credit for a film where control has been taken away from them.

Other multiple identities in use in the artistic world include Luther Blissett, Sandy Larson, Monty Cantsin, Geoffrey Cohen, and Karen Eliot. These multiple-use names were developed and popularized in the 1970s and 1980s in artistic subcultures like Mail Art and its offshoot Neoism, which coined the multiple-use name concept of the "open pop star." The avant-garde pre-texts include the pseudonym Rrose Sélavy jointly used by Dada artist Marcel Duchamp and the surrealist poet Robert Desnos.

In publishing, a long-running book series may be written by numerous authors but published under a uniting collective pseudonym. Examples include Carolyn Keene for the Nancy Drew Mystery Stories series and other mystery stories, and Franklin W. Dixon for the Hardy Boys series.

References in other realms of culture go back much further. Some examples are Buddha (which is both a proper noun and a condition that may be achieved by anyone), Poor Konrad (the collective name adopted by all Swabian peasants during their rebellion against taxes in 1514), Captain Ludd, Robin Hood and Captain Swing.

== Examples ==
- Anonymous
- Luther Blissett
- Monty Cantsin
- Geoffrey Cohen
- Karen Eliot
- Poor Konrad
- S. Larson
- Ned Ludd
- Netochka Nezvanova
- The Wallys
- John and Jane Doe

== See also ==
- Collective pseudonym
- I'm Spartacus, pop culture usage
- Kilroy was here signature
- Placeholder name
