= Three-sided football =

Variant of association football

Diagram of a three sided football pitch. The penalty areas can also be square or trapeziums

Three-sided football (often referred to as 3SF) is a variation of association football played with three teams instead of the usual two. Played on a hexagonal pitch, the game can be adapted to other versions of football.

Unlike conventional football, where the winner is determined by the highest scoring of the three teams, the winner in three-sided football is the team that concedes the fewest goals.

It was devised by the Danish Situationist Asger Jorn to explain his notion of triolectics, which was his refinement on the Marxian concept of dialectics, as well as to disrupt everyone's general idea of football.

== History ==
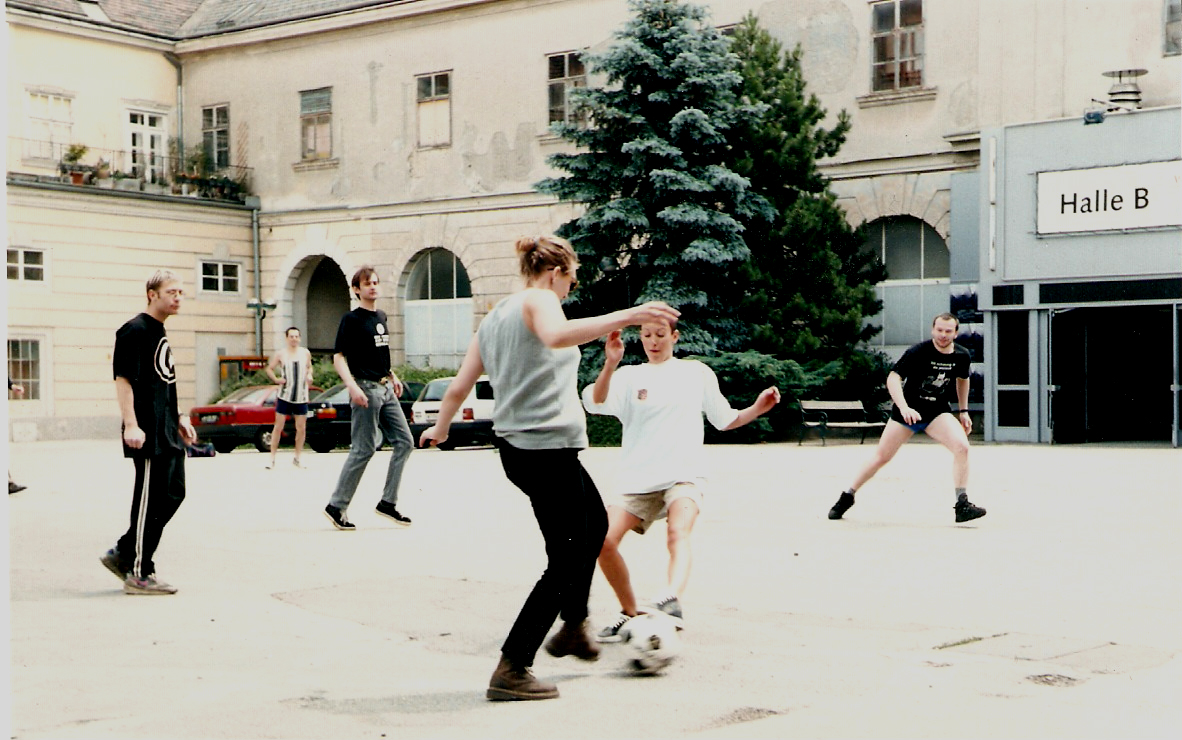
3 sided football workshop, at the 1st Intergalactic Conference of the Association of Autonomous Astronauts, Public Netbase, Vienna, Austria, Summer Solstice, 1997

The first known game of 3SF, played on Friday 28 May 1993, was organized by the London Psychogeographical Association on Glasgow Green as part of the Glasgow Anarchist Summer School. Participants included Richard Essex, Stewart Home and the members of The Workshop for Non-Linear Architecture.

Three-sided football has been practiced in various training sessions of the Association of Autonomous Astronauts in England, France, Italy and Austria, including the 1st Intergalactic Conference in Vienna (1997), the 2nd Intergalactic Conference in Bologna (1998), the Space 1999 in London, or as a protest event in Parc de La Villette during the 1998 two-sided football World Cup in Paris.

The Deptford Three Sided Football Club (D3FC) was founded in February 2012 to commemorate the 50th anniversary of Jorn's invention of the game in his 1962 book Naturens Orden. Games were held every other Sunday between D3FC and other local clubs at the Deptford Green Hexagon in Fordham Park, South East London.

From 2013 to 2021 the Sports Organization "Futbol 3 Colombia - F3C" has been conducting Three Sided Football (soccer 3) tournaments in public parks and universities in Bogotá - Colombia for children and young people (men and women) of low income and vulnerable. The Three Sided Football matches are held in various public parks such as: Servita Park, La Gaitana Park, Ciudad Montes Park, and since 2018 every Saturday in the Normandía neighborhood park in the city of Bogotá.

The first three-sided football match in Turkey was organized by InEnArt on 14 September 2013, to coincide with the 13th Istanbul Biennial. The match was played in front of Kadir Has University, Istanbul between Philosophy Football FC from the UK, FSC Dynamo Windrad Kassel from Germany and Ayazma FC from Turkey. The referee was Halil İbrahim Dinçdağ, who was suspended by the Turkish Football Federation in 2009 because of his sexuality. Geoff Andrews, manager of Philosophy Football FC, launched the International Three Sided Football Federation before this match.

The first three sided football match in Australia was held on 4 May 2014. It was held at St Kilda Primary School in Melbourne and featured the St Kilda All Sartres, Pythagoras 3FC (the Pys) and Atletico Geometry (the Geometers). The teams were mixed - an important feature of Australian Three Sided Football.

== Notable games ==
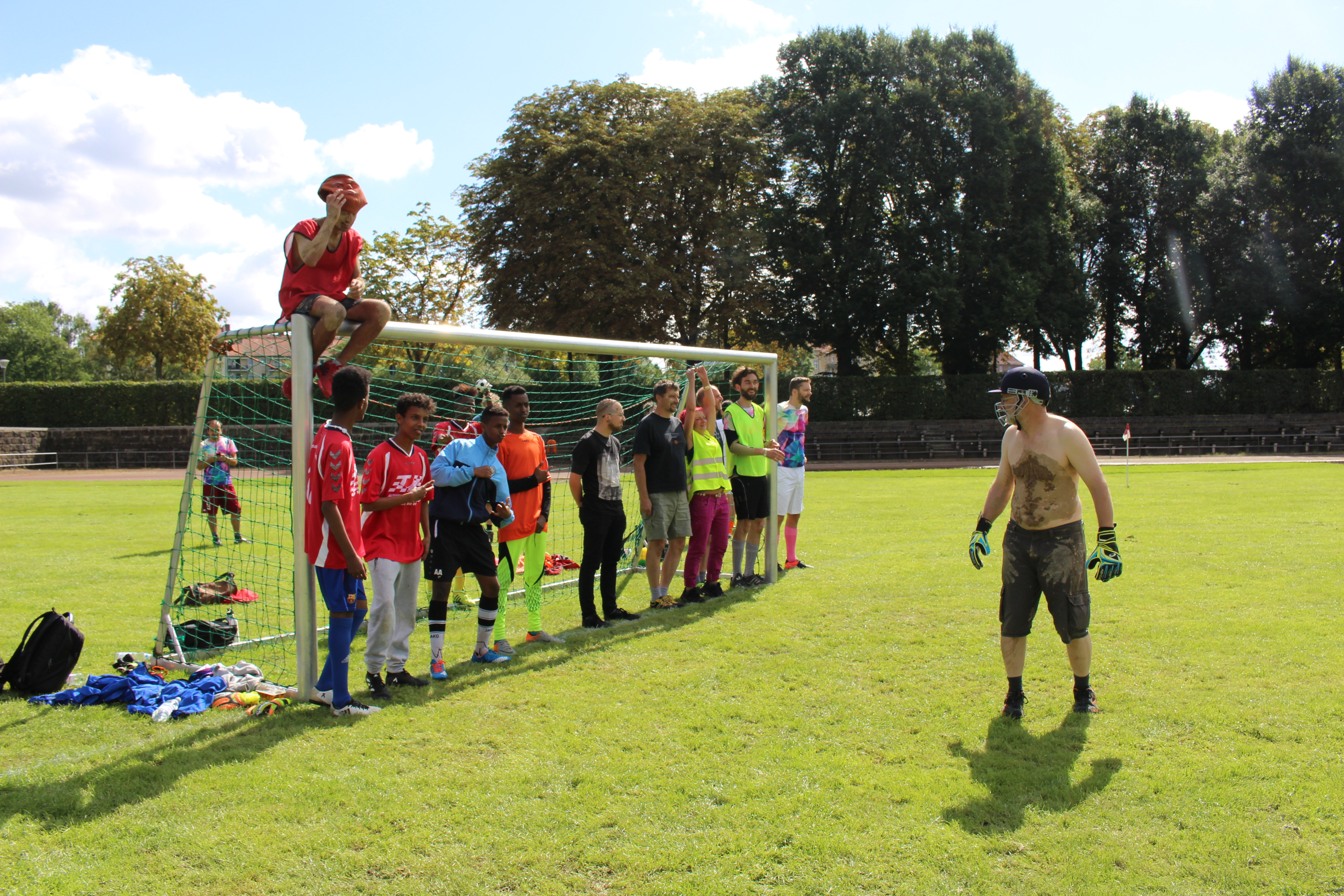
Psychic Workers 3SF Picket Line

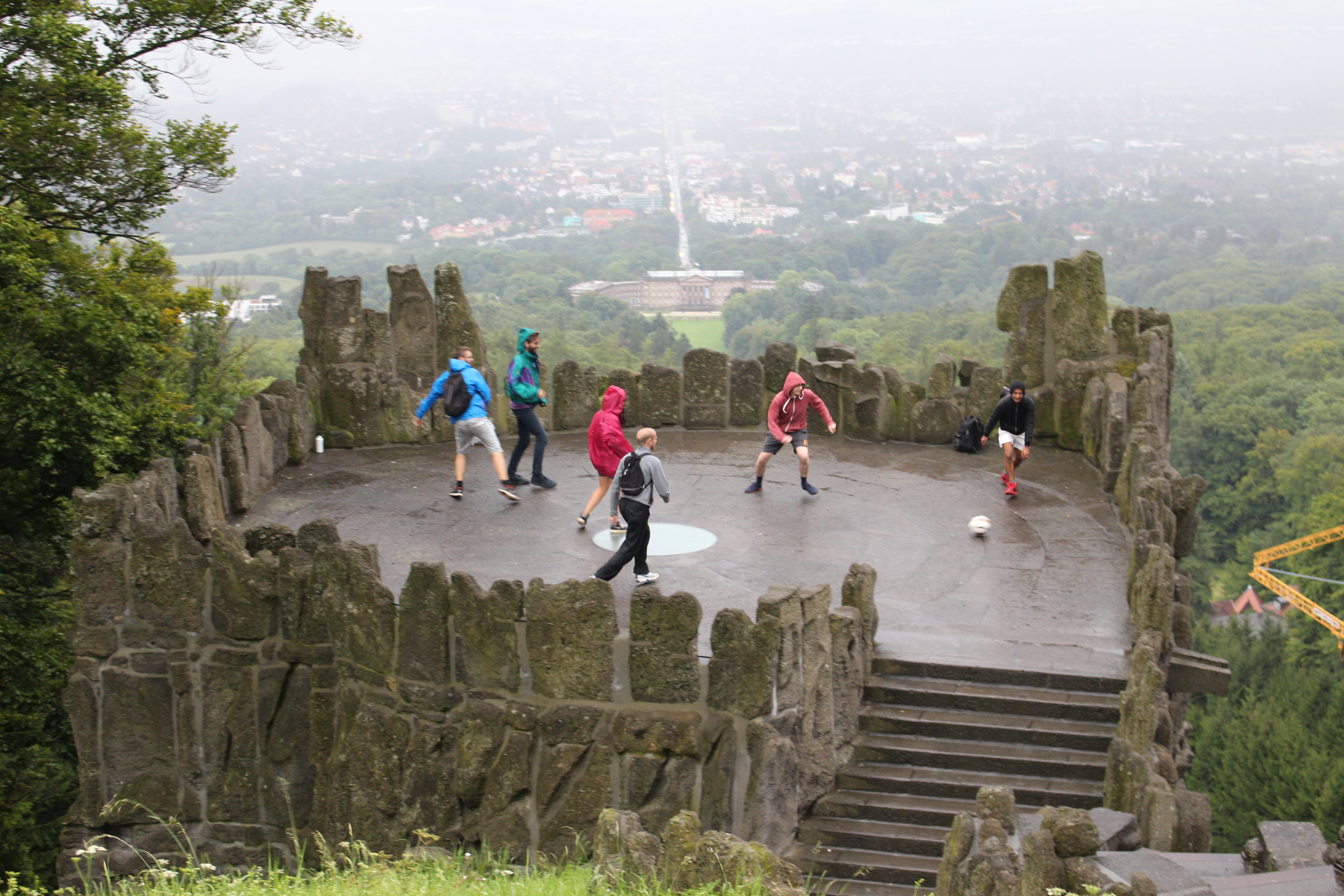
3SF at Kassel Ley Line Summit at Bergpark Wilhelmshöhe (Wilhelmshöhe Mountainpark)

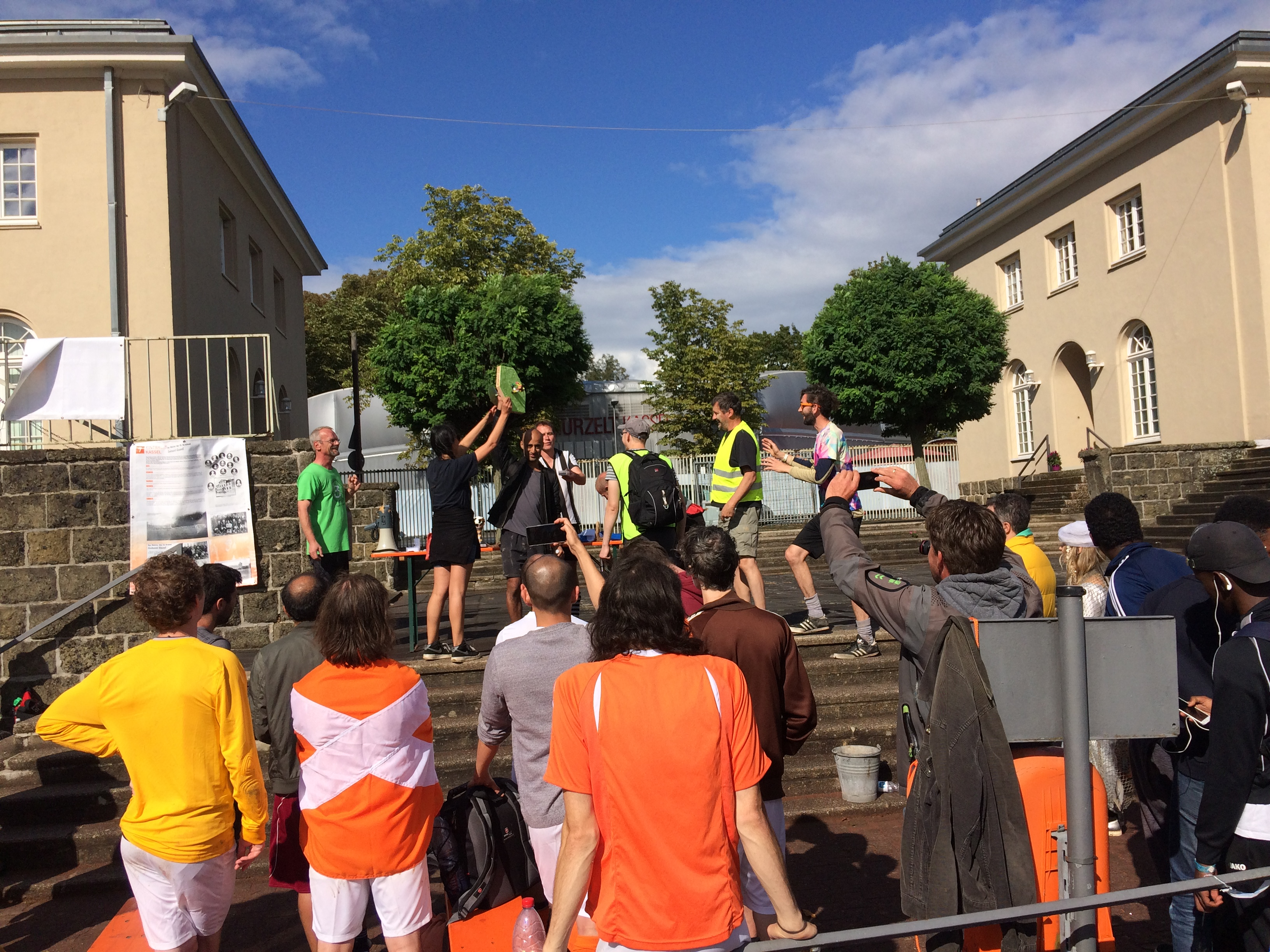
Smashing of the 2nd 3SF World Cup in Kassel by psychic workers of DAMTP

The first 3SF World Cup took place in cooperation with the International Three Sided Football Federation and the Museum Jorn in Silkeborg, Denmark, 23 May until 25 May 2014. Teams from France, Germany, Poland, England, Lithuania and Denmark sought to win the Cup. The Danish team Silkeborg KFUM were crowned champions.

The second 3SF World Cup was held at the Hessenkampfbahn in Kassel, Germany on Sat 19 August 2017. The tournament was hosted by Dynamo Windrad as part of documenta 14 and featured twelve teams originating from Germany, England, Poland and Lithuania. The final was contested between local side F2 Versenkt and two teams from the SE London league, Polish Husaria and New Cross Internationals. In a very tight and tactical game, New Cross Internationals scored the only goal of the game against F2 Versenkt. Although Polish Husaria and New Cross Internationals both finished the game with clean sheets, the rules of the tournament stated that in cases of a winning draw the team who scored the most goals in the match would be considered the winner. Therefore, New Cross Internationals were declared winners of the tournament.

In September 2014 Deptford Three Sided Football Club embarked on a new experiment in triolectics by establishing a formal league structure with five other teams from the local area. The inaugural teams involved in the league were Aesthetico Athletico, New Cross Irregulars 3FC, Philosophy Football Club, Polsky Budowlancy (now named Husaria), Strategic Optimists Football Club and, of course, Deptford Three Sided Football Club.[17] The inaugural season ended on 7 June 2015 with New Cross Irregulars being awarded the trophy, having mathematically won the title in the penultimate game of the season. The same six teams played in the 2015–16 season. It was decided on the final game of the season, with Husaria, Aesthetico Athletico and New Cross Irregulars 3FC playing each other in a match where all three teams could win the title. Defending champions NXI were taken out of contention early on, conceding 5 goals in total, and Husaria were crowned new champions courtesy of a single goal against Aesthetico. NXI, Aesthetico and Strategic Optimists all ended in joint second place, a single point behind winners Husaria.

In January 2017 the first season of the Triball 3SF league was established. Duplicating the Deptford points structure for the league table, Triball is played in a 4-a-side format between seven league teams. The league also hosts a cup competition called the Triball Open Cup.

On 31 October 2009, a three-sided football competition was organised in Lyon during the Biennale d'art contemporain de Lyon. The subversive event was a confrontation of the non spectacular sense of the original game with the main title of the Biennale, Le Spectacle du Quoditidien. The manifestation took place in Stade Laurent Gérin, Vénissieux and was organised by Pied La Biche association.[2]

In August 2009, a three-sided football game was played in Alytus as part of the Art Strike events there. Stewart Home acted as referee.

In the run-up to the 2010 UK General Election, a three-sided football game was played on 2 May 2010 in Haggerston Park, with each team representing one of the main political parties. This match was organised by Whitechapel Gallery in conjunction with Philosophy Football FC. The match was won by Philosophy Football FC, representing Labour, who conceded no goals to the Conservatives' 2 and Lib Dems' 3.[4] Philosophy Football FC later organised and competed in the first ever three-sided football match to be played in Spain, on 7 May 2011, which was discussed by journalist Sid Lowe in the Guardian's football podcast. Lowe's team won 3-5-5.

== Stadia ==
In 2017, Essex based architect Adam Leatherbarrow entered a Non-Architecture competition to showcase a conceptual design for a Three Sided Football Stadium. The design was based on pitch parameters, UEFA stadium guidance documents and inspired by German football stadia. The Stadium comprises six single tier stands and infilled with triangular seating to chamfer the hexagonal shape. The design was recognised by TalkSport's "The Late Tackle Podcast" where Adam gave an interview.

Shortly after the interview, Leatherbarrow's stadium concept featured in the June 2017 edition of Four Four Two magazine Titled "A Game of Three Halves". Adam stated "Something has got to be purpose-built, because I really hope the sport kicks off. Just imagine a game between West Ham, Chelsea and Spurs - it would be mad!"

== See also ==
- Omegaball
- Chinese checkers
- Three-player chess
- Sannin shogi
- A Game of War
