= Ann Quin =

British novelist

- Born: 17 March 1936; Brighton, Sussex, England
- Died: 27 August 1973 (aged 37); Brighton, East Sussex, England
- Body discovered: Shoreham-by-Sea, West Sussex, England
- Education: Convent of the Blessed Sacrament
- Occupation: Writer
- Years active: 1964-1973
- Notable work: Berg (1964), Three (1966), Passages (1969), Tripticks (1972)
- Style: Experimental, psychological fiction, satire, feminist literature

Ann Quin (17 March 1936 – 27 August 1973) was a British writer noted for her experimental style. The author of Berg (1964), Three (1966), Passages (1969) and Tripticks (1972), she died by drowning in 1973 at the age of 37.

== Life ==
Quin was born in Brighton, Sussex, in March 1936, in a family on the fringes of the working class and lower-middle class. Her father, former opera singer Nicholas Montague Quin, left the family, and she was raised by her mother, Ann (née Reid), alone.

She was educated at a Roman Catholic school, the Convent of the Blessed Sacrament in Brighton, until the age of 17. She trained as a shorthand typist and worked in a solicitor's office, then at a publishing company as a manuscript reader and as secretary to the foreign publishing rights manager, after which she moved to Soho and began writing novels. In 1964-65 Quin had an affair with Henry Williamson, the novelist who wrote Tarka the Otter, and who was some forty years her senior. Williamson portrayed her as Laura Wissilcraft in his novel The Gale of the World.

She had bouts of mental illness, suffering a breakdown whilst working in a hotel in Cornwall, and later receiving electro-shock treatment. During the first Bank Holiday weekend of August 1973, she drowned herself off Brighton's Palace Pier, weeks before the death of her contemporary B. S. Johnson. A witness named Albert Fox saw a woman walking into the sea and contacted the police; the next day, a yachtsman found a body near Shoreham Harbour. An appeal was launched in Brighton and Hove's local newspaper, The Argus, and the woman was identified as Quin. The coroner recorded an open verdict.

== Career ==
Quin is associated with a loosely constituted circle of 'experimental' authors in Sixties Britain, headed by B. S. Johnson and including Stefan Themerson, Rayner Heppenstall, Alan Burns and Eva Figes, influenced by Samuel Beckett and recent French fiction (Marguerite Duras, Alain Robbe-Grillet). They stood in opposition to the dominant tendency for social realism, manifest from John Osborne and John Wain to Karl Miller's Writing in England Today (Penguin, 1968).

Her first novel, Berg, was published by Calder & Boyars in 1964. It was influenced by Virginia Woolf, Anna Kavan and other female British modernists, as well as the French nouveau roman. Its opening line, 'A man called Berg, who changed his name to Greb, came to a seaside town intending to kill his father...' set the tone for a dark, psychological farce set in an unnamed seaside town that clearly resembles Brighton, which became the most critically acclaimed of her four novels.

Berg was followed by Three (1966), Passages (1969) and Tripticks (1972), illustrated by her lover Carol Annand, in which Quin continued her formal experimentation, although without making the same critical impact as she had with her debut.

== Influence ==
Her work has somewhat fallen into obscurity since her death, such that Lee Rourke could say in 2007: "Who cares about Ann Quin? I do, for one, but why does no one else seem to remember this writer from the front rank of Britain's literary avant-garde?" However, there has been a complete reprint of her works by Dalkey Archive Press and And Other Stories, as well as a critical biography by Robert Buckeye, with a collection of rare and previously unpublished stories and fragments, The Unmapped Country, published by And Other Stories in 2018. Contemporary authors Stewart Home, Tom McCarthy, Chloe Aridjis, Deborah Levy, Juliet Jacques, Ellis Sharp, Joanna Walsh, and Rourke have cited her work as an influence. Pop artist Billy Apple has stated that his then-partner Quin was the ghost-writer of his thesis.

In August 2022, Danielle Dutton published an article in The New Yorker praising Quin's work, especially how Tripticks satirizes the beatnik culture.

== Works ==
- Berg (Calder & Boyars, 1964; Dalkey Archive, 2001; And Other Stories, 2019, ISBN 978-1-911508-54-0)
- Three (Calder & Boyars, 1966; Dalkey Archive, 2005; And Other Stories, 2020, ISBN 978-1-911508-84-7)
- Passages (Calder & Boyars, 1969; Dalkey Archive, 2003; And Other Stories, 2021, ISBN 9781911508939)
- Tripticks (Calder & Boyars, 1972; Dalkey Archive, 2002; And Other Stories, 2022, ISBN 9781913505400)
- The Unmapped Country: Stories and Fragments, ed. Jennifer Hodgson (And Other Stories, 2018, ISBN 978-1-911508-14-4)

== Adaptations of her work ==
Berg was adapted for film in 1989 as Killing Dad, starring Denholm Elliott and Richard E. Grant.
