= Association of Autonomous Astronauts =

Art collective founded in 1995

Logo

The Association of Autonomous Astronauts (AAA) is a worldwide network of community-based groups dedicated to building their own spaceships. The AAA was founded 23 April 1995. Although many of their activities were reported as serious participation in conferences or protests against the militarization of space, some were also considered art pranks, media pranks, or elaborate spoof. The AAA had numerous local chapters which operated independently of one another, with the AAA effectively operating as a collective pseudonym along the lines of Luther Blissett (nom de plume).

The Association's ostensible five-year mission, a reference to Star Trek, was to "establish a planetary network to end the monopoly of corporations, governments and the military over travel in space". Artists who became involved were often connected to the zine scene or mail art movements. The five-year mission's completion was marked at the 2000 Fortean Times conference. Some chapters have continued activities to the present day. Several AAAers have experienced zero-gravity training flights.

The writer Tom Hodgkinson described participants as "a loose bunch of Marxists, futurists, and revolutionaries on the dole", going on to explicate their mission as "reclaim[ing] the idea of space travel for the common man". To the AAA, he said, "space travel represented an ideal of freedom". Annick Bureaud of Leonardo/OLATS viewed their work as "space art" that "combine[d] freely space, cyberspace, raves, esoteric things, techno-music, etc.", calling attention to "how they recycle ... key images (the MIR Space Station, the astronauts on the Moon, etc.) ... mixed with science-fiction (and specially Star Trek) buzz-words or images" and then subjected these "sacred icons" to "iconoclastic treatments".

In his book Unleashing the Collective Phantoms, the theorist Brian Holmes said of the AAA: "The ideas sound fantastic, but the stakes are real: imagining a political subject within the virtual class, and therefore, within the economy of cultural production and intellectual property that had paralyzed the poetics of resistance."

The London chapter participated in the J18 Carnival Against Capitalism protests during that year's G8 summit, with a contingent of AAA members dressed in space suits delivering a petition against the militarisation of space to the headquarters of Lockheed. The group was particularly concerned about the Cassini-Huygens spacecraft and its RTG power source performing an earth fly-by to boost its speed toward the outer Solar System.

== Timeline ==
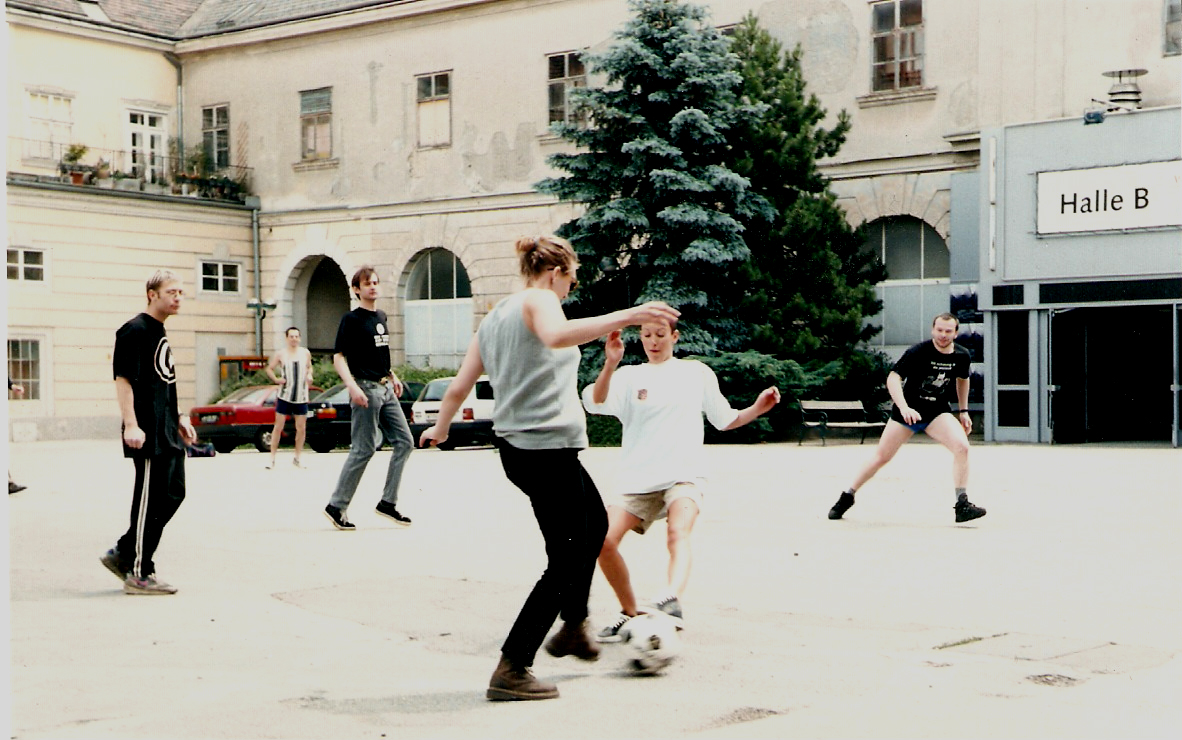
three sided football workshop, at the 1st Intergalactic Conference of the Association of Autonomous Astronauts, Public Netbase, Vienna, Austria Summer Solstice 1997

- 23 April 1995: Launch of the Association of Autonomous Astronauts in the grounds of Windsor Castle, UK.
- 23 April 1996: Publication of 1st Annual Report: "Here Comes Everybody!"
- 23 April 1997: Publication of 2nd Annual Report: "Dreamtime Is Upon Us!"
- 21–22 June 1997: 1st Intergalactic Conference – Public Netbase, Vienna, Austria
- 23 April 1998: Publication of 3rd Annual Report: "Moving in Several Directions At Once!"
- 18–19 April 1998: Intergalactic Conference – Link Centre, Bologna, Italy
- 23 April 1999: Publication of 4th Annual Report: "Space Travel By Any Means Necessary!"
- 18 – 27 June 1999: Space 1999: Ten Days Which Shook The Universe – various venues, London, UK. http://www.deepdisc.com/space1999/
- 23 April 2000: Publication of 5th Annual Report: "See You In Space!"
- The 333 days : series of encounters following the 5YP, including Gravité Zéro festival in Paris
- 23 April 2005: AAA's ten-year encounter in Paris (http://confluences.net), in support to Steve Kurtz and the Critical Art Ensemble
- 23 April 2007 : AAA II Wake-Up Communique: "The Dream Is Just Beginning"

== Music ==
- "Rave In Space" CD (2000)

== Influences on other subcultures ==
- Datacide magazine : https://web.archive.org/web/20050125235045/http://datacide.c8.com/
- London Psychogeographical Association : http://www.unpopular.demon.co.uk/lpa/organisations/lpa.html
- Gigabrother : https://web.archive.org/web/20180904053226/http://www.gigabrother.com/
- The Laboratory Planet journal : http://www.laboratoryplanet.org

== See also ==
- Asgardia (nation)
- El Club de los Astronautas
- Space art
