= Killing Dad =

Killing Dad (Or How To Love Your Mother)
- Directed by: Michael Austin
- Screenplay by: Michael Austin
- Based on: Berg by Ann Quin
- Produced by: Iain Smith
- Starring: Richard E. Grant; Denholm Elliott; Julie Walters; Anna Massey
- Cinematography: Gabriel Beristain
- Edited by: Edward Marnier; Derek Trigg
- Music by: Chaz Jankel; David Storrs
- Distributed by: Applecross Productions; Scottish Television Film Enterprises; British Screen
- Release date: 1989
- Running time: 89 minutes
- Country: United Kingdom
- Language: English

Killing Dad is a 1989 British black comedy film adapted from Berg, a 1964 novel by the British experimental writer Ann Quin. It stars Richard E. Grant as Alistair Berg, a man who travels to a seaside town intending to murder the father who abandoned him and his mother many years earlier, and is now living in a dilapidated hotel with a much younger woman.

== Plot summary ==
Alistair Berg is a neurotic only child and unsuccessful door-to-door salesman from Harlow New Town who arrives home one day to be informed by his mother that she has received a letter from his father, who abandoned them years earlier but now claims he wishes to be reunited with them. They agree that Berg should travel alone to Southend-on-Sea to meet him but on the way there he changes the name on his sample case from Berg to Greb, using this pseudonym when he checks in to the hotel his father is staying in. Although his father has gone out, Berg introduces himself to Judith, his much younger partner, and learns that his father is also going by a pseudonym, Mr. Hedge.

It becomes apparent that rather than reuniting with his father, Berg intends to murder him, something he makes several unsuccessful attempts at, the first one being when his father, Nathy, arrives back at the hotel late that night and, after introducing himself but not revealing he is his son, Berg attempts to kill him with a hammer but is unable to summon up the courage.

The next day Berg accompanies Judith to the bingo, where a fight breaks out. Back in the hotel, Judith throws Nathy out, and he enlists Berg to help him remove some of his belongings from the room which include a ventriloquist’s dummy he performs with. Shortly after this, they flee Nathy’s new lodgings due to him being unable to pay in advance and whilst on the seafront Berg makes another failed attempt at patricide, this time failing to drum up the courage to push his father off the pier.

Back in the hotel, Judith and Nathy reunite and hold a party; meanwhile, another of the hotel’s guests, a Spanish flamenco dancer named Luisa, makes cryptic references to Berg about both the Oedipus complex and that she somehow knows that Nathy is his father. After another argument, however, Judith throws the ventriloquists dummy out of a window, from where the same gang who started the fight at the bingo take it and put it on a bonfire before Nathy and Berg manage to retrieve it.

Later that night, Berg finally believes he has achieved what he set out to do when he strangles his sleeping father in his bedroom. The next day he confesses to Judith and they wrap the body in a rug and deposit it in the lost property office of the train station. However, during a celebratory dinner the landlady of the hotel brings them a letter from Nathy that she says he hand delivered that morning, leading Judith to question whether Berg really did kill him, and it transpires that he had mistakenly strangled the dummy, thinking it was his father, who is still alive.

Luisa now leaves for Broadstairs, where her next performance is due to take place, and as Berg bids her farewell his mother arrives at the train station in order to check on his progress, unaware of what has been going on. Judith has also transferred her affections to Berg, a relationship of which his mother does not approve, and after warning him about her she returns home. Back on the seafront, Berg and Nathy again encounter the gang, who steal a pram from a mother and put an unwilling Nathy in it, an escapade that ends up with Nathy, Berg and one of the gang members all in the sea. Having been rescued, Nathy again departs, and Berg and Judith vacate the hotel and travel to his mother’s house in order to inform her of their engagement.

Berg enters the house alone only to discover Nathy and his mother in bed together, which appears to trigger some sort of breakdown in Berg and leads him to flee the house and escape over the fence at the bottom of the garden, leaving an unwitting Judith waiting in the car. He then catches a bus that he hopes will take him to Broadstairs so that he can reunite with Luisa.

== Cast ==
- Nathy - Denholm Elliott
- Judith - Julie Walters
- Berg - Richard E. Grant
- Edith - Anna Massey
- Luisa - Laura del Sol
- Margot – Ann Way
- Diego – Tom Radcliffe
- Terry – Jonathan Phillips
- Ernie – Kevin Williams
- Maureen – Emma Longfellow
- Barber – Ronnie Stevens
- Luggage Attendant – Pearce Quigley
- Barmaid – Anna Chancellor

== Music ==
The music was by Chaz Jankel and David Storrs, with Juan Martin composing and conducting the flamenco guitar music. It also features the songs Summer Holiday and Run, Rabbit, Run.

== Reception ==
Time Out was not hugely positive about the film, saying that it made a ‘brief tour through the stock-room of British film comedy’ and that director Austin ‘seems to aspire to the satirical bite of Mike Leigh, but never achieves the accuracy, let alone the truth.’ It added that Grant, ‘struggling against being upstaged by a 1964 Beatles wig, employs his usual nose-wrinkling, eye popping mannerisms’ whilst using an unconvincing accent, but was more positive about his co-stars, praising Elliott as ‘wonderfully seedy’ and saying that Walters brought some ‘much-needed warmth to her gin-sodden vamp: convincing, funny and sad.’

The reviewer for Variety, however, was more positive about Grant, describing his performance as ‘gently menacing’ and all the acting as ‘first-rate’, though felt that overall the film was not a success, saying of Austin that ‘unfortunately his script is not up to par. The black humor he is trying for does not come off and he has to resort to slapstick to get the odd laugh.'

Grant’s book With Nails: The Film Diaries of Richard E. Grant, which covers most of his 1987–1994 films, makes no mention of the film, though his personal website quotes him as describing it as ‘a flick that played one week in the West End and then went straight to video’ and that his hairstyle in it is ‘the best thing about the film’. In addition, Giles Gordon, in his introduction to the 2001 reissue of the source novel, Berg, does not mention the adaptation.

== Trivia ==
Anna Chancellor has a small, non-speaking role as a barmaid in the bingo hall that Judith and Berg visit.
