= T-ough Press =

Underground Russian publisher

T-ough Press is a "subterranean" publishing house based in the southern suburbs of Moscow. It was established by Alex Kervey.

Kervey started the business when he found he could not get his own translations published. Existing publishers had either never heard of such writers as Hunter S Thompson, or found the material offensive. He has used young translators in their twenties to publish a range of texts from Western Europe and America, such as:

- William S. Burroughs: Junky and Ghost of Chance
- Hunter S. Thompson: Fear And Loathing in Las Vegas and Hell's Angels: The Strange and Terrible Saga of the Outlaw Motorcycle Gangs
- Aleister Crowley: Diary of a Drug Fiend
- Irvine Welsh: Trainspotting
- Stewart Home: Blow Job, Come Before Christ and Murder Love
- Tony White Road Rage!/Satan! Satan! Satan!

In 2006 T-ough Press faced prosecution for publishing Home's Come Before Christ and Murder Love and White's Road Rage!/Satan! Satan! Satan!. They were accused of pornography and insulting Christian values. Their premises were also fire bombed. This has been ascribed to fascists. The National Bolsheviks have taken particular exception to Blow Job which satirises their blend of right-left politics. Legal and political pressure has also delayed the appearance of Home's Tainted Love and Slow Death.
