= London Psychogeographical Association =

Organization dedicated to playful, unplanned urban exploration, Situationist precursor

- Abbreviation: LPA
- Merged into: Situationist International
- Formation: c. 1957
- Founder: Ralph Rumney
- Headquarters: London

The London Psychogeographical Association (LPA), sometimes referred to as the London Psychogeographical Committee, is an organisation devoted to psychogeography. The LPA is perhaps best understood in the context of psychogeographical praxis.

== London Psychogeographical Institute ==
The LPA was first mentioned in 1957 by the British artist Ralph Rumney, as one of the organisers of the "First Exhibition of Psychogeography" in Brussels, which included his work. According to many accounts the group eventually merged into the Situationist International. Rumney was in fact the only member of the 'Association'.

== LPA East London Section ==
Logo of the East London Section of the London Psychogeographical Association

In the 1990s, the LPA was reinvoked as the LPA East London Section by Fabian Tompsett, using the pseudonym Richard Essex, who published a series of newsletters and pamphlets under its name, as well as the writers grouped around the multiple user name Luther Blissett, including Stewart Home. Activities of the ELS also included trips to destinations of psychogeographical interest and the organisation of three sided football matches.

This version of the LPA has been described by the writer Iain Sinclair, whose work is often described as psychogeographical, as useful in "branding" that kind of practice.

In 1994 Barry Hugill wrote an article for The Observer covering the LPA. He depicted their ideas as "so cranky that to mention Mr Ackroyd's name in the same breath is to invite a writ." However he also states that "the psychogeographers fear that in 2000 there may be an attempt to perpetuate patriarchy through the ritual murder of a top member of royalty."

The work of Luther Blissett, Stewart Home and other psychogeographical groups is said to involve the issuing of numerous leaflets and letters under a series of aliases, both personal and organisational, and the description of interactions, including collaborations and feuds, between both these and other, real people and groups (for example between Luther Blissett and the parapolitical researcher Larry O'Hara).

The last LPA Newsletter was issued around the year 2000.

== See also ==
- Neoist Alliance
- Association of Autonomous Astronauts
- Class Wargames
