= Stewart Home =

English artist, filmmaker, and writer (born 1962)

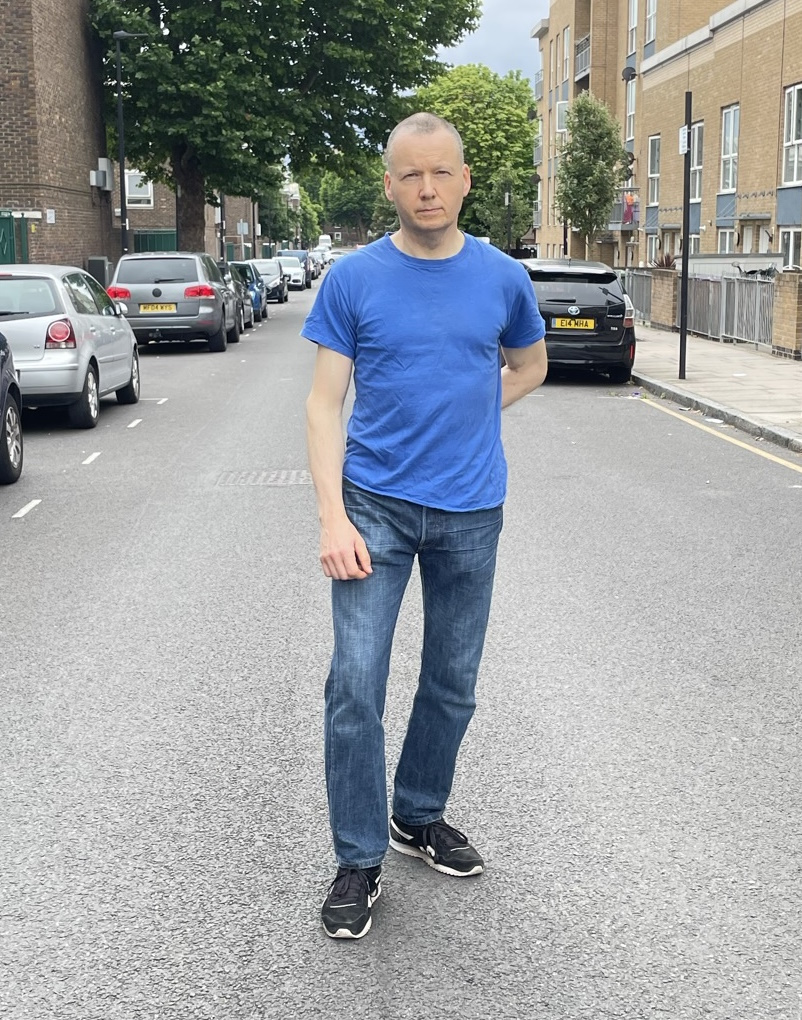
- Home pictured in the Isle of Dogs, June 2022
- Born: 24 March 1963 (age 63); London, England
- Occupation: Writer
- Writing career
- Genres: Fiction, Psychogeography, Punk
- Notable works: Pure Mania (1989); Art School Orgy (2023); 69 Things to Do with a Dead Princess (2002)
- Website: stewarthome.co.uk

Kevin Llewellyn Callan (born 24 March 1962), better known as Stewart Home, is an English artist, filmmaker, writer, pamphleteer, art historian, and activist. His novels include the non-narrative 69 Things to Do with a Dead Princess (2002), and the re-imagining of the 1960s in Tainted Love (2005). Earlier parodistic pulp fictions work includes Pure Mania, Red London, No Pity, Cunt, and Defiant Pose, which pastiche the work of 1970s British skinhead pulp novel writer Richard Allen and combine it with pornography, political agit-prop, and historical references to punk rock and avant-garde art.

== Life and work ==
Home was born in Wimbledon (then in Surrey), South London. His mother, Julia Callan-Thompson, was a model who was associated with the radical arts scene in Notting Hill Gate.

In the 1980s and 1990s, he exhibited art and also wrote a number of non-fiction pamphlets, magazines, and books, and edited anthologies. They chiefly reflected the politics of the radical left, punk culture, the occult, the history and influence of the Situationists – of whom he is a severe critic – and other radical left-wing 20th century anti-art avant-garde movements. In Home's earlier work, the focus of these reflections was often Neoism, a subcultural network of which he had been a member, and from which he derived various splinter projects. Typical characteristics of his activism in the 1980s and 1990s included use of group identities (such as Monty Cantsin) and collective monikers (e.g. "Karen Eliot"); overt employment of plagiarism; pranks and publicity stunts.

=== 1970s ===
As a youth, Home was drawn first to music and bohemianism, and then to radicalism. He attended meetings of many different leftist groups including several organised by the Trotskyist Socialist Youth League and even two editorial meetings of Anarchy Magazine. He did not join these organisations and later repudiated them as reactionary, instead professing autonomous communist political positions after going to the London Workers Group. In the late 1970s, Home produced his first punk (music) fanzines, including early issues of Down in the Street, which had run to seven numbers by the time he stopped publishing it in 1980. At the end of the 1970s, Home also made his first public appearances as a musician as bassist with revolutionary ska band The Molotovs.

=== 1980s ===
In the 1980s, Home attended Kingston University. From 1982 to 1984, Home operated as a one-person-movement "Generation Positive", and having already founded a punk band called White Colours (named after an experimental novel by R. D. Reeve) in 1980, he started a new group with the same name in 1982. He also published an art fanzine SMILE, the name of which was a play on the Mail Art zines FILE and VILE (which in turn parodied the graphic design of LIFE magazine). The concept was that many other bands in the world should call themselves White Colours, and many other underground periodicals should call themselves SMILE, too. Home's early SMILE magazines mostly contained art manifestos for the "Generation Positive", which in their rhetoric resembled those of 1920s Berlin Dadaist manifestos.

In April 1984, Home got in touch with the originally American subcultural artistic network of Neoism, and participated in the eighth Neoist Apartment Festival in London. Since Neoism operated with multiple identities, too, and called upon all its participants to adopt the name Monty Cantsin, Home decided to give up the "Generation Positive" in favor of Neoism, and make SMILE and White Colours part of Neoism as well. According to Florian Cramer (who didn't come into contact with Neoism until the late eighties) one year later, Home took a sleep-deprivation prank played with him at a Neoist Festival in Italy as the reason to declare his split from Neoism; Home insists he decided to break with Neoism before going to Italy. Shortly before, a conflict between him and Neoism founder Istvan Kantor had escalated and led to their alienation.

Home's SMILE no 8, which appeared in 1985, reflected the split with Neoism by proposing a "Praxis" movement to replace Neoism, with Karen Eliot as its new multiple name. This and the following three SMILE issues otherwise featured an eclectic mixture of manifesto-style writing, political reflections on radical left-wing anti-art movements from the Lettrist International, the Situationists, Fluxus, Mail Art, individuals such as Gustav Metzger and Henry Flynt, and short parodistic skinhead pulp prose in the style of his then unwritten early novels. Many texts included in Home's SMILE issues plagiarised other, especially Situationist, writing, simply replacing terms like "spectacle" with "glamour".

At the same time, Home was involved in a series of collective installations including "Ruins of Glamour" (Chisenhale Studios, London 1986), "Desire in Ruins" (Transmission Gallery, Glasgow 1987), "Refuse" (Galleriet Läderfabriken, Malmö 1988) and "Anon" (33 Arts Centre, Luton 1989) which generated serious art world interest and art publication reviews and even coverage in British newspapers such as "The Observer" and "Independent". Those Home worked closely with on these shows included Hannah Vowles and Glyn Banks (collectively known as Art in Ruins), Ed Baxter and Stefan Szczelkun.

Following on from this and drawing on 1980s American appropriation art, Home's concept of plagiarism soon developed into a proposed movement and a series of "Festivals of Plagiarism" in 1988 and 1989, which themselves plagiarised the Neoist apartment festivals and 1960s Fluxus festivals. Home combined the plagiarism campaign with a call for an Art Strike between 1990 and 1993. Unlike earlier art-strike proposals such as that of Gustav Metzger in the 1970s, it was not intended as an opportunity for artists to seize control of the means of distributing their own work, but rather as an exercise in propaganda and psychic warfare aimed at smashing the entire art world rather than just the gallery system.

The Art Strike campaign caused something of a rumpus in the contemporary London art world (Home got to talk about the Art Strike at venues such as the Institute of Contemporary Art and Victoria and Albert Museum, as well as on national BBC Radio arts programmes and London area television arts programmes), but was more seriously discussed in subcultural art networks, especially in Mail Art. Consequently, mail artists made up a reasonable proportion of the participants at the Festivals of Plagiarism, and Mail Art publications disseminated the Art Strike campaign.

In the 1980s, Home was also a regular contributor to the anarcho-punk/cultural magazine VAGUE.

=== 1990s ===
In 1993, Home officially resurfaced, having meanwhile gained an influence and reputation in American counter-culture comparable to writers like Hakim Bey and Kathy Acker. Aside from reassessments of his earlier engagement with Neoism, the Situationists, punk, and the plagiarism and Art Strike campaigns, and, as his source of income, the continued pulp-novel writing.

In the post-Art Strike years, he had for the first time publicly occupied himself with hermeticism and the occult. The Neoist Alliance, his third one-person-movement after The Generation Positive and Praxis, served simultaneously as a tactical reappropriation of the Neoism label for self-promotional purposes, and as a corporate identity for pamphlets that satirically advocated a combination of artistic avant-garde, the occult, and politics into an "avant-bard".

Higgs included Home in group shows he curated – such as "Imprint 93" at City Racing (London June–July 95), "Multiple Choice" at Cubitt Gallery (London March–April 96) and "A to Z" at Approach Gallery (London 1998) – as well issuing a pamphlet and later a badge by Home as part of his prestigious edition of Imprint 93 multiples. At this time, uber curator Hans Ulrich Obrist also included Home in his survey of young British art Life/Live at the Musée d'art Moderne de la Ville de Paris (October 1996–January 1997, subsequently toured). In the mid-1990s, Home was also appearing regularly as a live artist at "Disobey" events organised by Paul Smith and featuring music from the likes of techno acts Panasonic and Aphex Twin.

=== 2000s ===
Aware of the marked decline in countercultural activities throughout the urban centres in which he operated, Home shifted gear in this area of his work in the new millennium, upping his level of Internet activities; web work had been only a minor part of his repertoire in the 1990s.

Home's novels in this period no longer incorporated subcultural elements and instead focused on issues of form and aesthetics: 69 Things to Do with a Dead Princess contains capsule reviews of dozens of obscure books as well as elaborate descriptions of stone circles, while in Down and Out in Shoreditch & Hoxton every paragraph is exactly 100 words long. At times in this period, Home's film making also became radically non-representational, and rarely required any original cinematography whatsoever; for example, his 2002 fiftieth-anniversary English-language colour re-make of Guy Debord's Screams in Favour of De Sade, and 2004's Eclipse & Re-Emergence of the Oedipus Complex, the latter consists solely of still photographs of his mother with a narration scripted by Home but delivered by Australian actress Alice Parkinson.

This tendency towards abstraction was already evident in some of Home's work of the 1990s, particularly sound pieces such as the cut-up radio play Divvy, but in the 2000s it became increasingly central to his output.

Art School Orgy

Despite having a lengthy publishing record with established publishers, Home still had difficulties, in recent years, finding publishers for his work, notably Art School Orgy, on account of the central character sharing the name with living artist David Hockney. The book depicts Hockney participating in scenes of extreme BDSM. During 2021, Home promoted the book via social media, predominantly via Facebook, and a series of YouTube videos featuring Home with an inflatable doll named David Hockney. The book was eventually published in January 2023 by Loughborough-based online record label New Reality Records and sold via their Bandcamp page.

== Neoist Alliance ==
The Neoist Alliance was a moniker used by Home between 1994 and 1999 for his mock-occult psychogeographical activities. According to Home, the alliance was an occult order with himself as the magus and only member. The manifesto called for "debasement in the arts" and in a parodic manner plagiarized a 1930s British fascist pamphlet on cultural politics. Alliance activities mainly consisted of the publication of a newsletter called Re-action, which appeared in ten issues.

In 1993, the Neoist Alliance staged a prank against a concert by composer Karlheinz Stockhausen in Brighton by announcing its intention to levitate the concert hall by magical means during the concert. This was an homage to the 1965 anti-art picketing of a Stockhausen concert in New York by Fluxus members Henry Flynt and George Maciunas.

Alliance activities ran parallel and were closely related to those of the revived London Psychogeographical Association and the Italian-based Luther Blissett project.

Despite its name, the Neoist Alliance had no affiliation with the international Neoist network which had been active since 1980. Stewart Home had previously become a member and activist of that network in 1984, but renounced it one year later and subsequently worked under the collective monikers of "Praxis", later "plagiarism" and the Art Strike movement.

== Books ==
Despite its highly personal perspective and agenda, The Assault on Culture: Utopian currents from Lettrisme to Class War (Aporia Press and Unpopular Books, London, 1988) is considered a useful art-history work, providing an introduction to a range of cultural currents which had, at that time at least, been under-documented. The work has, however, been highly criticised for deficiencies in its view of utopian currents, including its personal biases, by such writers as Bob Black.

Pure Mania, Home's first novel from 1989, took the recipe of the Richard Allen parodies from SMILE and turned them into a recipe for much of his subsequent novel writing of the 1990s (there are exceptions such as the non-linear "Come Before Christ & Murder Love"). The book Neoist Manifestos/The Art Strike Papers featured, on its first part, abridged versions of Home's manifesto-style writings from SMILE, and a compilation of writings and reactions regarding the Art Strike from various authors and sources, mainly Mail Art publications.

His 1995 novel Slow Death fictionalises and ridicules this process of the historification of Neoism (including the planting of archives at the National Art Library in the Victoria and Albert Museum.

Home's novel Cunt was rejected by several publishers before being published by Do-Not Press in 1999. Its plot, which satirises travel writing, the picaresque novel and the publishing industry, centres on David Kelso, an author attempting to write a trilogy recounting his sexual experiences. Confusion Incorporated: A Collection of Lies, Hoaxes and Hidden Truths, published in the same year, is a collection of fictional interviews, reviews and essays. A third 1999 publication, the pamphlet Repetitions: A Collection of Proletarian Pleasures Ranging from Rodent Worship to Ethical Relativism Appended with a Critique of Unicursal Reason, consists of letters, prefaces and introductions.

=== Repression in Russia ===
Alex Kervey of T-ough Press, publishers of the Russian edition of Come Before Christ and Murder Love has reported repression of the book as "pornography and insulting Christian values". Kervey says this is happening in the context of a campaign run by such far-right groups as the National Bolsheviks against Home, which has included arson attacks against T-ough Press alongside state censorship.

== Bibliography ==
=== Novels ===
- Pure Mania (Edinburgh: Polygon, 1989. Finnish translation, Helsinki: Like, 1994. German translation, Hamburg: Nautilus, 1994).
- Defiant Pose (London: Peter Owen, 1991. Finnish translation, Helsinki: Like, 1995. German translation, Hamburg: Nautilus, 1995). Some of the action of this novel takes place on the Samuda Estate
- Red London (AK Press, London & Edinburgh 1994, ISBN 1-873176-12-0; Finnish translation, Helsinki: Like, 1995).
- Slow Death (London: Serpent's Tail, 1996. Finnish translation, Helsinki: Like, 1996) ISBN 978-1-85242-519-7
- Blow Job (London: Serpent's Tail, 1997. Finnish translation, Helsinki: Like, 1996. Greek translation, Athens: Oxys Publishing, 1999. German translation, Hamburg: Nautilus, 2001).
- Come Before Christ and Murder Love (London: Serpent's Tail, 1997).
- Cunt (London: Do-Not Press, 1999), ISBN 978-1-899344-45-1
- Whips & Furs: My Life as a bon-vivant, gambler & love rat by Jesus H. Christ (London: Attack! Books, 2000).
- 69 Things to Do with a Dead Princess (Edinburgh: Canongate Books, 2002), ISBN 978-1-84195-353-3
- Down and Out in Shoreditch and Hoxton (Do-Not Press, London 2004).
- Tainted Love (Virgin Books, London 2005).
- Memphis Underground (Snowbooks, London 2007).
- Blood Rites of the Bourgeoisie (BookWorks, London 2010).
- Mandy, Charlie & Mary-Jane (Penny-Ante Editions, 2013).
- The 9 Lives of Ray The Cat Jones (Test Centre, 2014).
- She's My Witch (London Books, 2020).
- Art School Orgy (New Reality Records, Loughborough 2023)

=== Stories ===
- No Pity (AK Press, London & Edinburgh 1993, ISBN 1-873176-46-5; Finnish translation Like, Helsinki, 1997).

=== Poetry ===
- SEND CA$H (Morbid Books, London 2018).

=== Non-fiction ===
- The Assault on Culture: Utopian currents from Lettrisme to Class War (Aporia Press and Unpopular Books, London, 1988) ISBN 0-948518-88-X (New edition AK Press, Edinburgh 1991. Polish translation, Wydawnictwo Signum, Warsaw 1993. Italian translation AAA edizioni, Bertiolo, 1996. Portuguese translation, Brazil: Conrad Livros, 1999. Spanish translation, Virus Editorial, 2002. Russian translation, Asebeia, 2020).
- Neoist Manifestos (Edinburgh: AK Press, 1991).
- Cranked up Really High: Genre Theory And Punk Rock (Hove: Codex, 1995, new edition 1997. Italian translation, Rome: Castelvecchi, 1996) (an "inside account" of the history of punk rock).
- Conspiracies, Cover-Ups and Diversions: A Collection of Lies, Hoaxes and Hidden Truths (London: Sabotage Editions, 1995).
- Green Apocalypse (a critique of the magazine and organisation Green Anarchist) with Luther Blissett (London: Unpopular Books, 1995).
- Analecta (London: Sabotage Editions, 1996).
- Neoism, Plagiarism and Praxis (AK Press, London, Edinburgh 1995. Italian translation Costa & Nolan Genoa 1997).
- The House of Nine Squares: Letters on Neoism, Psychogeography And Epistemological Trepidation, with Florian Cramer (London: Invisible Books, 1997).
- Disputations on Art, Anarchy and Assholism (London: Sabotage Editions, 1997).
- Out-Takes (London: Sabotage Editions, 1998).
- Confusion Incorporated: A Collection of Lies, Hoaxes & Hidden Truths (Hove: Codex, 1999).
- Repetitions: A Collection of Proletarian Pleasures Ranging from Rodent Worship to Ethical Relativism Appended with a Critique of Unicursal Reason (London: Sabotage Editions, 1999).
- Anamorphosis: Stewart Home, Searchlight and the plot to destroy civilization (London: Sabotage Editions, 2000).
- Jean Baudrillard and the Psychogeography of Nudism (London: Sabotage Editions, 2001).
- Fasting on SPAM and Other Non-aligned Diets for Our Electronic Age (London: Sabotage Editions, 2002).
- The Intelligent Person's Guide to Changing a Lightbulb (London: Sabotage Editions, 2005).
- The Correct Way to Boil Water (London: Sabotage Editions, 2005).
- The Easy Way to Falsify Your Credit Rating (London: Sabotage Editions, 2005).
- Re-Enter The Dragon: Genre Theory, Brucesploitation & the Sleazy Joys of Lowbrow Cinema (Melbourne: Ledatape Organisation, 2018).
- Fascist Yoga, Grifters, Occultists, White Supremacists, and the New Order In Wellness (London: Pluto Press, 2025).

=== As editor ===
- Festival of Plagiarism, ed. (London: Sabotage Editions, 1989).
- Art Strike Handbook ed. (London: Sabotage Editions, 1989).
- What is Situationism? A Reader, ed. (Edinburgh and San Francisco: AK Press, 1996), ISBN 978-1-873176-13-9.
- Mind Invaders: A Reader in Psychic Warfare, Cultural Sabotage And Semiotic Terrorism, ed. (London: Serpent's Tail, 1997).
- Suspect Device: Hard-Edged Fiction (London: Serpent's Tail, 1998).
- Denizen of the Dead: The Horrors of Clarendon Court (London: Cripplegate Books, 2020).

=== Spoken word and releases ===
- Comes in Your Face (London: Sabotage, 1998).
- Cyber-Sadism Live! (London: Sabotage, 1998).
- Pure Mania (London: King Mob, 1998).
- Marx, Christ & Satan United in Struggle (Molotov Records, 1999).
- Proletarian Post-Modernism (Test Centre, 2013).

=== Funded Internet projects ===
- NATURAL SELECTION (1998 organised by Graham Harwood & Matt Fuller, funded by the Arts Council).
- TORK RADIO (1998 organised by Cambridge Junction, funded with lottery money).

=== Exhibitions ===
- Humanity in Ruins, Central Space (London, February/March 1988).
- Vermeer II, workfortheeyetodo (London, July to September 1996).
- Becoming (M)other, Artspace (London, December 2004 to January 2005).
- In Transition Russia, NCCA (Moscow, November/December 2008).
- Hallucination Generation: High Modernism in a Tripped Out World, Arnolfini (Bristol, April to May 2006).
- Again, A Time Machine at White Columns (New York, October/November 2011).
- Part of Again, A Time Machine: a Book Works touring exhibition in six parts, SPACE (London, April to May 2012).
- Tilt, Building F (London November 2013).
- The Age of Anti-Ageing, The Function Room (London, October/November 2014).
- Re-Enter The Dragon, Queens Park Railway Club (Glasgow, April 2016).
- Dual Flying Kicks, 5 Years (London, June 2018).
- Sexus Maleficarum, Darling Pearls & Co (London, September 2020 – January 2021).

=== Selected film and videos ===
- Ut Pictura Poesis (1997, 35 mm, part of project organised by Cambridge Junction with Arts Council funding).
- Screams in Favour of De Sade (2002, 60 mins).
- Has The Litigation Already Started? (2002, 70 mins).
- The Golem (2002, 84 mins).
- Eclipse & Re-Emergence of the Oedipus Complex (2004, 41 mins).
- Oxum: Goddess of Love (2007, 30 mins).
- Re-Enter The Dragon (2016, 41 mins).
- Bondage As Theme & Technique (2019, 40 minutes).

== See also ==
- Anti-art
- Art manifesto
- 3:AM Magazine
