= Neoism =

Parodistic -ism

Neoism is a parodistic -ism. It refers both to a specific subcultural network of artistic performance and media experimentalists, and, more generally, to a practical underground philosophy. It operates with collectively shared pseudonyms and identities, pranks, paradoxes, plagiarism and fakes, and has created multiple contradicting definitions of itself in order to defy categorization and historization.

== Background ==
Definitions of Neoism were always disputed. The main source of this is the undefinable concept of Neoism which created vastly different, tactically distorted accounts of Neoism and its history. Undisputed, however, are the origin of the movement in the late 1970s Canada. It was initiated by Hungarian-born Canadian performance and media-artist Istvan Kantor (aka Monty Cantsin) in 1979, in Montreal. At around the same time the open-pop-star identity of Monty Cantsin was spread through the Mail Artist David Zack (born New Orleans, June 12, 1938, died presumably in Texas ca. 1995) with the collaboration of artists Maris Kudzins and performance artist Istvan Kantor.

Schisms followed in the mid-1980s. Questions and concerns arose about whether the "open pop star" Monty Cantsin moniker was being overly associated with certain individuals. Later, writer Stewart Home sought to separate himself from the rest of the Neoist network, manifesting itself in Home's books on Neoism as opposed to the various Neoist resources in the Internet. In non-Neoist terms, Neoism could be called an international subculture which in the beginning put itself into simultaneous continuity and discontinuity with, among others, experimental arts (such as Dada, Surrealism, Fluxus and Concept Art), punk, industrial music and electropop, political and religious free-spirit movements, science fiction literature, 'pataphysics and speculative science. Neoism also gathered players with backgrounds in graffiti and street performance, language writing (later known as language poetry), experimental film and video, Mail Art, the early Church of the Subgenius and gay and lesbian culture. Neoism then gradually transformed from an active subculture into a self-written urban legend. As a side effect, many other subcultures, artistic and political groups since the late 1980s have—often vaguely—referred to or even opposed Neoism and thereby perpetuated its myth.

Since the gradual disappearance of Neoism in the 1990s, brief offshoots have appeared including The Seven By Nine Squares, Stewart Home's frequent use of Karen Eliot (as well as Sandy Larson, Luther Blissett (nom de plume) and others) to replace Monty Cantsin as the embodiment of the open pop star concept. "This project... confuses the restrictions that both define and delimit individual identity.... Changing details, such as biographical particulars... are usually considered indispensable [sic] in securing the signature of an individual."

== History ==
Neoism, as a name for a different context, was coined in 1914 by the American satirist Franklin P. Adams as a parody of modern arts. In a letter from 1916, Ezra Pound disparagingly referred to second-wave modernist poets as "the neoists". Sydney J. Bounds used the word as the name of a planet in his 1977 science fiction story No Way Back. In 1980 Monty spent two weeks at mail artist Ginny Lloyd's San Francisco Storefront, a one year living art project holding art events and installations in a storefront window. He lived in the space, compiled writings and launched his Blood Campaign.

Neoism quickly spread to other places in America, Europe and Australia and involved up to two dozens of Neoists. Until the late 1980s and before the mass availability of the Internet, the mail art network continued to be used as the main communication and propaganda channel for Neoism.

Neoists refer to their strategies as "the great confusion" and "radical play". They were acted out in semi-private Apartment Festivals which took place in North America, Europe and Australia between 1980 and 1998 and in publications which sought to embody confusion and radical play rather than just describing it. Consequently, both Neoist festivals and Neoist writing experimented with radical undermining of identity, bodies, media, and notions of ownership and truth. Unlike typical postmodern currents, the experiment was practical and therefore existential. Monty Cantsin, for example, was not simply a collective pseudonym or mythical person, but an identity lived by Neoists in their everyday life.

For these purposes, Neoists employed performance, video, small press publications (such as Smile, the international magazine of multiple origins) and computer viruses, but also food (Chapati), flaming steam irons and metal coat hangers (used as telepathic antennas). Borrowing from Thomas Pynchon, Neoism could be more suitably called an "anarchist miracle" of an international network of highly eccentric persons collaborating, often with extremist intensity, under the one shared identity of Monty Cantsin and Neoism.

In 2004, Neoism was cited by Javier Ruis in response to the National Assembly Against Racism's condemnation of anarchists disrupting the Third European Social Forum session on anti- m and anti-racism in London (PGA Considered As Neoist Invisible Theatre).

In the early 1980s, the Neoist Reinhard U. Sevol founded Anti-Neoism, which other Neoists adopted by declaring Neoism a pure fiction created by Anti-Neoists. The Dutch Neoist Arthur Berkoff operated as a one-person-movement "Neoism/Anti-Neoism/Pregroperativism". Similarly, Blaster Al Ackerman declared himself a "Salmineoist" after Sicilian-American actor Sal Mineo, and John Berndt was credited by Ackerman as having given Neoism the name "Spanish Art," circa 1983. In 1989, following the post-Neoist "Festival of Plagiarism" in Glasgow, Scotland, artist Mark Bloch left mail art and after publishing "The Last Word" remained defiantly silent on Neoism for almost two decades. In 1994, Stewart Home founded the Neoist Alliance as an occult order with himself as the magus. At the same time, Italian activists of the Luther Blissett project operated under the name "Alleanza Neoista".

In 1997, the critic Oliver Marchart organized a "Neoist World Congress" in Vienna which did not involve any Neoists. In 2004, Istvan Kantor received the Governor General's Award, and an international "Neoist Department Festival" took place in Berlin.

== Influences on other artists and subcultures ==
With their design prank CONSUMER'S REST Lounge Chair, the "one-man artist group" Stiletto Studio,s established a sub- as well as counter-culturally motivated connection between neoistically determined aspects of cultural consumption criticism and design consumption critical aspects of Neues Deutsches Design (New German Design) at the 9th Neoist Festival in Ponte Nossa in 1985 and at the Festival of Plagiarism in Braunschweig's University of Art in 1988. They also engaged in media consumption-critical public relations work in neoist collaborations and conspirations, especially with Neoism's foremost therrorist tENTATIVELY, a cONVENIENCE (cit.: "Neoism is a prefix and a suffix with no substance in between") on the aspect of Interpassivity, a neoist term coined by Stiletto. Since 1988 they had been consulted by Gordon W. on a regular, from 1994 on predominantly interpassive basis as antineoist nutritionists. In 1995 Stiletto Studio,s presented LESS function IS MORE fun as a post-neoist special waste sale of design-defuncts in the Spätverkauf project store by Laura Kikauka at the Volksbühne Berlin.

Other artists who explicitly if vaguely credit Neoism are The KLF, Luther Blissett, Alexander Brener/Barbara Schurz, Lee Wells and Luke Haines (of The Auteurs and Black Box Recorder). The contemporary Dutch Artist Thomas Raat created a series of artworks based on Neoist manifestos and photographic documents.

== Quotes ==
"Neoism is a prefix and a suffix with no substance in between" - tENTATIVELY, a cONVENIENCE

"Neoism is a movement to create the illusion that there's a movement called Neoism." "Come, join us. We want war with you." - John Berndt

"If Neoism didn't exist, we would have to NOT create it" - Artemus Barnoz

"It is not a matter of describing Neoism but of abolishing" - Luther Blissett

"Neoism doesn't exist except in the reactions it creates" - Roberto Bui (Wu Ming Yi)

"Time is not money and we have plenty of it" - Kiki Bonbon

"Plagiarism is Necessary. Progress Implies It. NO MORE MASTERPIECES!" - Karen Eliot

"Neoisms not just for Xmas, it's for life!" - Stewart Home

"We are the Neoists, do NOT listen to us" - Monty Cantsin

== Selected books ==
- A Neoist Research Project (2010), ed. N.O. Cantsin, London: OpenMute, ISBN 978-1-906496-46-3, 246 pages; the first comprehensive anthology and source book of Neoist writing and images, documenting Neoist interventions, Apartment Festivals, definitions and pamphlets of Neoism and affiliated currents, language and identity experiments and Neoist concepts and memes.
- Touchon, Cecil (2008). New and Improved Neoist Manifesto—a Trans-Lingual Edition. The Neoist Society in association with Ontological Museum Publications. ISBN 978-0-615-25881-2. Features Touchon's trans-lingual Neoist Manifesto with commentaries by Monte Cantsin and Karen Eliot.
- Oliver Marchart: Neoismus /Neoism, Edition Selene, Klagenfurt – Wien 1997, ISBN 3-85266-038-6

== See also ==
- Artivism
- Church of the SubGenius
- Situationist International
