= Karen Eliot =

Shared nom de plume for activist and artistic endeavours

Karen Eliot is a multiple identity, a shared pen name that anyone is welcome to use for activist and artistic endeavours. It is a manifestation of the "open pop star" idea within the Neoist movement. The name was developed in order to counter the male domination of that movement, the most predominant multiple-use names previously being Monty Cantsin and Luther Blissett.

The experimental composers and artists David Chokroun, Aydem Azmikara, André Éric Létourneau, Marc Couroux, Engram Knots, and Vanessa Grey have used "Karen Eliot" to collectively and anonymously write musical compositions during and throughout their lifetimes. According to writer Eldritch Priest, as a composer "Karen Eliot belongs to nobody and is no one...the collective nature and schematic indirection of 'Karen Eliot' circulates her contradictions and inconsistencies in a way that keeps doubt and the status of her reality in play." Many of André Éric Létourneau's radio-art works are also signed by Karen Eliot.

== History of multiple-use names ==
These multiple names were developed and popularized in artistic subcultures of the 1970s to 1990s like Mail Art, Neoism and post-Situationist discourse, with the pseudonym Rrose Sélavy – jointly used by Dada artist Marcel Duchamp and the surrealist poet Robert Desnos – forming a historical precedent, as did the poetry of Taliesin. The political references go back much further, for instance to Ned Ludd.

In the 1960s underground culture the multiple name Emmett Grogan was adopted by San Francisco Diggers. In the 1970s the multiple name Wally was adopted by The Wallies of Wessex, a group of squatters in and around Stonehenge.
