= Luther Blissett (pseudonym) =

Collective pseudonym used by cultural activists

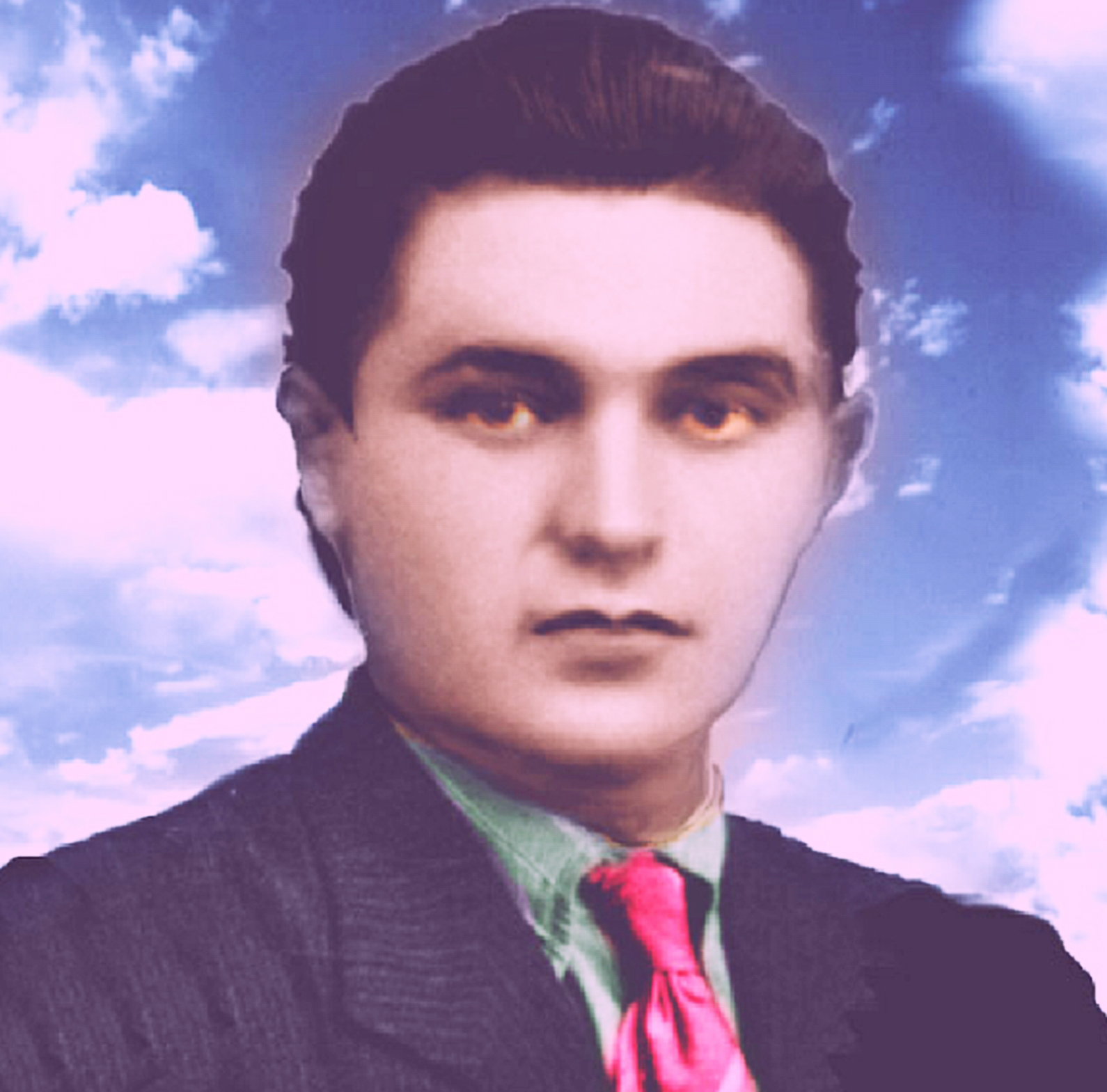
The photographic portrait of the imaginary Luther Blissett, made with digital techniques in 1994 and used as a symbol of the homonymous project and set of collectives.

Luther Blissett is a multiple-use name and an open pop star informally adopted and shared by hundreds of artists and activists all over Europe and the Americas since 1994. The pseudonym first appeared in Bologna, Italy, in mid-1994, when a number of cultural activists began using it for staging a series of urban and media pranks to experiment with new forms of authorship and identity. From Bologna, the multiple-use name spread to other European cities, such as Rome and London, as well as countries like Germany, Spain, and Slovenia. Sporadic appearances of Luther Blissett were also noted in Brazil, Canada, Finland, and the United States.

For reasons that remain unknown, the pseudonym was borrowed from a real-life Luther Blissett, a notable association football player in the 1980s. In December 1999, the Italian activists who had launched the Luther Blissett Project in 1994 decided to discontinue usage of the name by committing metaphorical ritual suicide, or seppuku. After authoring the best-selling historic novel Q as "Luther Blissett", five of them went on to found the writers' collective Wu Ming.

== Background ==
=== Multiple-use names ===
Marco Deseriis coined the concept of "improper names" (nomi impropri), which includes two subcategories: "collective pseudonyms" (pseudonimi collettivi) whose use is controlled and centralized, and "multiple-use names" (nomi di uso multiplo), which are subject to "decentralized and idiosyncratic" uses. For Deseriis, Luther Blissett is not a collective pseudonym like Wu Ming but a name of multiple use. "Multiple name" (nome multiplo) is instead the expression used by the English writer, artist, and essayist Stewart Home for a series of names of multiple use, such as Monty Cantsin and Karen Eliot, who were forerunners of Luther Blissett between the 1970s and 1990s in the context of mail art and artistic avant-gardes like Neoism.

=== Real Luther Blissett ===
The multiple identity is named after the footballer Luther Blissett, who played for the England national football team and is best known for his time at Watford and Milan in the 1980s, among other clubs. It is particularly popular among Italian subcultural activists and artists. The reasons the group chose the name was unclear to mainstream journalists; the BBC suggested that Blissett, one of the first black footballers to play in Italy, may have been chosen to make a statement against right-wing extremists in the country. It was also suggested that when being scouted by Milan, the Watford player they were impressed with was in fact John Barnes and they mistakenly bid for Blissett being one of the two black strikers at the club, and thus the group may have taken the name as a reference to a red herring. According to one former member, the decision was based purely on the perceived comic value of the name.

Since the beginning of the project, the real Blissett has been aware of the group taking his name. Early reports differed widely in saying whether he liked the attention he received because of them. On 30 June 2004, he appeared on the British television sports show Fantasy Football League – Euro 2004, broadcast on ITV, and joked about his own alleged involvement in the Luther Blissett Project. After host Frank Skinner read a line from the novel Q's prologue ("The coin of the kingdom of the mad dangles on my chest to remind me of the eternal oscillation of human fortunes"), Blissett produced a copy of Luther Blissett's Italian book Totò, Peppino e la guerra psichica 2.0 (Toto, Peppino and The Psychic War 2.0) and quoted extensively from it in the original Italian: "Anyone can be Luther Blissett simply by adopting the name Luther Blissett" (Chiunque può essere Luther Blissett, semplicemente adottando il nome Luther Blissett). At the end of the show, hosts and guests all said in unison: "I am Luther Blissett!"

=== Luther Blissett's mythmaking and politics ===
While the folk heroes of the early-modern period and the 19th century served a variety of social and political purposes, the Luther Blissett Project was able to utilize the media and communication strategies unavailable to their predecessors. According to Deseriis, the main purpose of the Luther Blissett Project was to create "a folk hero of the information society" whereby knowledge workers and immaterial workers could organize and recognize themselves. (Note: Luther Blissett was meant to be a kind of contemporary Robin Hood, a folk hero about whom unverifiable facts are told, and we never bothered to confirm or deny them. It was a very simple project: anyone who wanted could use the name Luther Blissett to sign something, to claim an action, a work, an article, a writing, anything. There was only one rule: whoever signed a work with the name Luther Blissett could not then claim an exclusive copyright on it, precisely because they were taking advantage of Luther Blissett's collective reputation, which obviously helped give visibility to a work. In exchange for this, it had to be allowed to be freely reproduced, disseminated, and accessible to anyone, as long as it was not for profit, which is how we also published the novel Q ... anyone who wanted could announce that Luther Blissett had signed something through an email that went to the Luther Blissett News newsletter, so as to inform the community surrounding the project of what had been signed. It was also possible to sign a piece of writing in this way that contradicted another piece of writing signed in the same way; it was very free from this point of view: we had a radio broadcast in which if one of us intervened and said something with which we might disagree, immediately afterward someone else would intervene and say, "I don't agree with what I said before," "I said," because within Luther Blissett we called each other "I" because we were all Luther Blissett: once you signed something with this name, you were Luther Blissett, even if you could then also do something else with your first and last name without any problem. — Wu Ming 2, former member of the Luther Blissett Project, "Interview with Wu Ming 2")

Luther Blissett became a positive mythic figure that was supposed to embody the very process of community and cross-media storytelling rather than being understood only as a Media prankster and culture jammer. Roberto Bui, one of the co-founders of the Luther Blissett Project and Wu Ming, explained the function of Luther Blissett and other radical folk heroes as mythmaking or mythopoesis. Bui said that mythopoesis was "the social process of constructing myths, by which we do not mean 'false stories,' we mean stories that are told and shared, re-told and manipulated, by a vast and multifarious community, stories that may give shape to some kind of ritual, some sense of continuity between what we do and what other people did in the past. A tradition. In Latin the verb 'tradere' simply meant 'to hand down something,' it did not entail any narrow-mindedness, conservatism or forced respect for the past. Revolutions and radical movements have always found and told their own myths."

Another important element was relationship of the Italian Luther Blissett Project to the autonomist and Marxist theory of labour known as operaismo (Italian for "workerism"). Drawing from the work of Italian workerists, such as Antonio Negri, Paolo Virno, Maurizio Lazzarato, and others, the activists of the Luther Blissett Project envisioned Blissett as the expression of the capacity of immaterial workers to produce forms of wealth that cannot be properly measured and attributed to an individual producer. The incalculability of these new forms of labour is articulated in the "Declaration of Rights of Luther Blissett", redacted by the Roman Luther Blissett Project in 1995. In this manifesto, the Luther Blissett Project argued that because in late capitalism any social activity can potentially generate value, the culture and media industries should guarantee a basic income to every citizen detached from individual productivity. (Note: The industry of the integrated spectacle and immaterial command owes me money. I will not come to terms with it until I will not have what is owed to me. For all the times I appeared on TV, films, and on the radio as a casual passersby or as an element of the landscape, and my image has not been compensated ... for all the words or expressions of high communicative impact I have coined in peripheral cafes, squares, street corners, and social centres that became powerful advertising jingles, without seeing a dime; for all the times my name and my personal data have been put at work inside stats, to adjust the demand, refine marketing strategies, increase the productivity of firms to which I could not be more indifferent; for all the advertising I continuously make by wearing branded t-shirts, backpacks, socks, jackets, bathing suits, towels, without my body being remunerated as a commercial billboard; for all of this and much more, the industry of the integrated spectacle owes me money! I understand it may be difficult to calculate how much they owe me as an individual. But this is not necessary at all, because I am Luther Blissett, the multiple and the multiplex. And what the industry of the integrated spectacle owes me, it is owed to the many that I am, and is owed to me because I am many. From this viewpoint, we can agree on a generalized compensation. You will not have peace until I will not have the money! LOTS OF MONEY BECAUSE I AM MANY: CITIZEN INCOME FOR LUTHER BLISSETT! — Roman Luther Blissett Project, "Declaration of Rights of Luther Blissett")

== History ==
=== Early appearances ===
Luther Blissett first appeared in Bologna in the late summer of 1994. According to graphic artist and publisher Piermario Ciani (1951–2006), who was among the first to popularize the pseudonym in Italy, the plan to launch Luther Blissett was "concocted between Bologna and Rovigo, with the complicity of an old retired mail artist". The postal artist was Alberto Rizzi, credited by Wu Ming with the idea for the prank on Chi l'ha visto and honoured with frequent appearances in the collective's novels. In Q, he is Adalberto Rizzi, best known as "Frate Pioppo". The "first explosion" took place in Friuli. This refers to the prank against the television programme Chi l'ha visto, which was staged in December 1994 but had been prepared in the previous two months.

In October 1994, in order to make Luther Blissett a pop icon, two graphic artists in Bologna (Andrea Alberti and Edi Bianco) worked on photo portraits from the 1930s and created a fictitious face. From the very beginning, a distinction was made between Luther Blissett, a pseudonym anyone could use, and the Luther Blissett Project, "an organized network within the open community", active primarily in Italy, committed to defining and implementing strategies for using the name. Connected to the Luther Blissett Project were the MIR (Men in Red) collectives, dedicated to radical ufology and the protagonist (especially in the two-year period 1998–1999) of sensational exploits, and AAA (Association of Autonomous Astronauts).

=== Peak of fame ===
Luther Blissett reached the height of fame when it was used to sign the novel Q, published in 1999, so much so that the Eurispes Institute's "Rapporto Italia" included in Chapter V dedicated to the theme "Lie/Truth", a long report on the diffusion of the pseudonym, titled "The Invisible Insurrection: The Luther Blissett Case". Through various initiatives—sabotage, performances, demonstrations, publications, videos, and radio broadcasts, the pseudonym quickly spread to various Italian and European cities, such as Rome and London, and then to Germany, Spain, and Slovenia. Sporadic appearances of Luther Blissett were also noted in the Americas, such as in Canada, the United States, and Brazil.

A Luther Blissett collective was the author of the 2007 book book Il processo illecito. Tutte le verità nascoste dell'estate del calcio: intercettazioni abusive, sabbie, fumi, abusi di potere e procure creative, a critical analysis of the 2006 Italian football scandal (Calciopoli), which involved among others Blissett's former football club Milan but was especially focused by both the investigators and the media on Juventus. Alongside the website Ju29ro.com, a group of lawyers, accountants, and communication experts who collected and verified court rulings, despite the significant disadvantage in terms of visibility, this Luther Blissett collective was able to successfully create a counter-information that ultimately debunked most of the allegations by the prosecution and the media (match fixing, rigged leagues and drawing lots, Juventus exclusive or preferential relations with the referee designators, gifts, corrupted referees, journalists, and judges, a referee forcibly closed in the locker room, GEA World as a criminal conspiracy aimed at illegal competition with use of threats and violence, and comparisons to the Italian Mafia, the Sicilian Mafia Commission, and Propaganda Due) at the dawn of the scandal and that had created a trial by media, overturning the presumption of innocence and the right to a fair trial, free from sensationalism.

=== Suicide, Wu Ming re-birth, and Q ===
On 31 December 1999, LBP activists committed a metaphorical suicide. In the announcement, seppuku was defined as "the last, extreme, radical disappearance of a popular hero". (Note: Many of the Italian columns of the Luther Blissett Project have decided to begin the millennium with seppuku, a ritual suicide. Suicide is the practical demonstration of Blissett's renunciation of survival as a logic of identity and territoriality ... It's not about advocating a nihilistic and defeatist solution, but about choosing life. Seppuku is not a directive; Luther Blissett is a name anyone can continue to use even after the New Year of 2000. There are countries where the struggle has only just begun, and it's best to hope it continues. Seppuku is a suggestion for all those who have been using the name for at least five years, to make room for new styles of this martial art, allowing the five-year plans of those who have only recently adopted the multiple names to flourish and proliferate. It's necessary to be a nameless stranger in unfamiliar territory: for some, this means starting or continuing to call themselves L.B.; for others, it necessarily means the opposite. Thus, seppuku isn't the end of Luther Blissett, but the beginning of a new phase, a new way of using his face and name. For those who took part, Blissett's suicide meant ceasing to sign with that acronym, but continuing on a path. — Luther Blissett Project, "Seppoku!") The seppuku was commemorated on the CD Luther Blissett: The Open Pop Star (WOT4, 2000), which featured artists such as Japanese artist Merzbow, Klasse Kriminale, and Le Forbici di Manitù, the "artistic vandal" Piero Cannata, and the French philosopher Jacques Camatte. Also in 2000, the four authors of Q, together with a fifth writer, formed the Wu Ming collective. The novel Q was written by four Bologna-based members of the Luther Blissett Project (Roberto Bui, Giovanni Cattabriga, Federico Guglielmi, and Luca Di Meo), as a final contribution to the project, and published in Italy in 1999. It was subsequently translated into English (British and American), Spanish, German, Dutch, French, Portuguese (Brazilian), Danish, Polish, Greek, Czech, Russian, Turkish, Basque, Serbian, and Korean. In August 2003, the book was nominated by The Guardian for its First Book Prize.

In 1999, Q reached the final of the Strega Prize. The authors boycotted the ceremony, describing as "a farce, one of the many useless institutions of this country". They added: "Naturally we are not interested in winning, also because first place is always assigned in advance, but if by chance we were to enter the top five, we advised Einaudi to buy us fourth place." They also said that the Strega Prize was "more rigged than Sanremo and this year it has already been outsourced to Maraini." There were still five weeks to go until the final, which on 9 July saw Luther Blissett coming fourth and crown Dacia Maraini the winner with her collection of short stories Buio. In January 2000, after their seppuku, the authors of Q formed a new group called Wu Ming (Chinese for "nameless"), under which name many novels were published in several languages and countries.

== Limited selection of Blissett's stunts, pranks, and media hoaxes ==
In January 1995, Harry Kipper, a British conceptual artist, disappears at the Italo-Slovenian border while touring Europe on a mountain bike, allegedly with the purpose of tracing the word ART on the map of the continent and disappearing while tracing the final letter. The victim of the prank was a famous missing-persons prime-time show on the Italian state television. They sent out a TV crew to look for a person that never existed. They went as far as London, where novelist Stewart Home and Richard Essex of the London Psychogeographical Association posed as close friends of Kipper's. The hoax went on until Luther Blissett claimed responsibility for it. It was the TV programme Chi l'ha visto? that took an interest in the case, sending a crew to the scene of the alleged disappearance and to London, the artist's supposed hometown, and only at the last moment before going on air the editorial staff realized that Kipper did not exist.

This was followed by the September 1994–May 1995 experiment. Starting in September 1994, a Bolognese community radio began broadcasting Radio Blissett, a late-night show featuring a variable number of Luther Blissetts who "patrolled" the city on foot and called the studio from local phone booths. Inspired by the Letterist International and Situationist International's urban drift or dérive—a seemingly aimless wandering through the city whereby psychogeographers go in search of heightened emotional experiences—Radio Blissett allowed players to interact at a distance in real time. Listeners could also call in from home and direct the patrols to various locations to join or create unexpected social events, including guerrilla-theater interventions, street parties, three-sided football matches, and "psychic attacks" against public buildings and institutions. In the spring of 1995, the experiment was duplicated in Rome, where the wider extension of the city required the simultaneous use of car patrols and cell phones. The Saturday night show, which aired on the frequencies of Radio Città Futura, featured psychic attacks against the Italian copyright office, the office of employment, and other semi-improvised direct actions which culminated in one of the most well-known episodes of the Blissett's saga.

On 17 June 1995, a few dozen participating in the Roman Radio Blissett boarded a night tram at different consecutive stops. A rave party took place on the vehicle until the police decided to stop it. Requested to disembark and identify themselves, the ravers refused to identify themselves other than with the multiple-use name. A riot ensued in which the police fired three shots in the air. A journalist from Radio Citta' Futura covered the event with his cell phone broadcasting the riot and the shots on the radio programme. The radio programme caused a media sensation. Also in June 1995, the paintings of Loota, a female chimpanzee, were to be exhibited at the Venice Biennale of Contemporary Arts. In the context of the hoax, Loota was described as a former victim of sadistic experiments in a pharmaceutical lab. The ape was then saved by the Animal Liberation Front, and later became a talented artist. Some newspapers announced the event; however, Loota did not exist. A November 1995 article in the Workshop for Non-Linear Architecture journal Viscosity stating that the K Foundation had announced a 23-year moratorium on "all further activity" following their burning of a million pounds in cash on the Isle of Jura was credited to Luther Blissett. Also in 1995, the newspaper Il Resto del Carlino published a story about model Naomi Campbell's visit to Bologna for cosmetic surgery. The revelation that the story was false caused a stir in the editorial staff of the Bologna-based newspaper. (Note: Two recent hoaxes, picked up and passed off as true, led to the "commissioning" of the newspaper's chief reporter, Fabio Raffaelli, who was placed under the tutelage of deputy editor Mauro Tedeschini and simultaneously promoted to editor-in-chief by Riffeser. First, the Carlino published a letter from a (nonexistent) HIV-positive student, forced into prostitution and happy to take revenge by piercing her clients' condoms, which was launched, complete with posters, at newsstands. No one suspected that the letter was signed L.B. (aka Luther Blissett). And no one checked the source or bothered to track down the poor girl. A momentous blunder. Then another blunder. All the newspaper offices in Bologna received a scoop: top model Naomi Campbell was in town for a "touch-up" by a surgeon. The newspapers verified with a few phone calls and discovered that the beautiful Naomi had never left New York. Instead, the Carlino falls for it and publishes the story, with color photos on the front page. An own goal. Luther Blisset is laughing somewhere. — "Finalmente Luther segna. 2 a 0 per Il Resto del Carlino", Cuore)

Between 1995 and 1996, Luther Blissett organized collective "psychogeographic drifts", a practice of Situationist origin, coordinated by the radio programme Radio Blissett in Rome and Bologna. On the evening of 18 March 1995, during one such drift held on the Roman tram network, about one hundred people occupied a bus to hold a "traveling party". The police stopped the vehicle and detained twenty participants in the event. Four of them were tried for resistance and contempt. In the same year, Luther Blissett took part in the Disordinazioni projects on urban intervention. Throughout the two-year period of 1995 and 1997, especially in Bologna, Luther Blissett organized performances of Situationautic Theatre (not Situationist as it is sometimes described). In addition to the drifts and performances, theoretical interventions on urban planning and urban life are multiplying, published in the magazine Luther Blissett or read during conferences. On 17 December 1996, a conference on the environment was held at the Cinema Imperiale in Guidonia, with the participation of local administrators, the associative world and numerous citizens. The report by Luther Blissett was read, introduced as "full professor of Psychogeography at the University of Rome", who was absent from the meeting but brought a point of view on the "waste belt". In 1996, some members of the project provided Mondadori, a publishing house interested in commercially exploiting the media phenomenon, with random texts from the Internet. Mondadori published them under the title net.gener@tion, billing them as "the manifesto of new freedoms". (Note: [Net.gener@tion] is at the very centre of a singular case. A collaborator of the Segrate-based publishing house received the text in his inbox, piece by piece. A few days ago, during the advertising launch, Luther Blissett revealed the hoax. Here's what Luther wrote, again him, to the "Corriere Multimedia" inbox: "I sent Mondadori scraps of the countercultural debate from two or three years ago, with some clearly false and contradictory passages. I foisted them on a publishing house that cannot and will not be able to own the singular and multiple creature that I am." Added publisher Alberto Castelvecchi, who calls himself the emerging leader of the movement ("I am to Luther Blissett what Sinn Fein is to the IRA"); "L.B. cannot tolerate that Mondadori has placed copyright on the book and that curiously dissociated itself from the content, with a note." In this sense, the prank was a complete success: its purpose, say its creators, was to demonstrate that no one, not even a major publishing house, can truly control what it publishes. The same thing could happen with the article you're reading right now. The whole prank thing could be a prank. You decide. — "Giornali, una risata vi seppellirà. Il movimento Luther Blissett beffa la Mondadori. E promette altre sorprese", Corriere della Sera)

In 1997, many Italian newspapers published the news of the arrest of Gelmini, a controversial founder of several drug rehabilitation centres, for child sexual abuse. The news, spread by Luther Blissett in a phone call to ANSA, was false but destined to become reality ten years later when Gelmini was in fact investigated for the same crimes. Between 1995 and 1997, Viterbo newspapers denounced the practice of black masses and ritualistic violence in the woods surrounding the city. The newspapers peppered the satanists' actions with details, and the news even reached Studio Aperto, giving rise to a collective panic in the city. Luther Blissett claimed responsibility for the elaborate prank in an episode of TV7, the weekly programme of TG1. (Note: Exactly a year of scattered news about an alleged Satanic cult active in Tuscia. News reported by local and national newspapers, investigations by the Carabinieri, and finally a video broadcast on Italia 1 from Paolo Liguori's Studio Aperto. And who was behind this "news"? Luther Blissett, him again, the multiple name behind which many "information guerrillas" hide. In short, the story of the Satanic cult was a new "media hoax" that will be revealed tonight by TV7, the weekly news programme of Tg1, airing at 10:40 PM. The information about the cult's activities, the programme recalls, came largely from a self-styled committee for "the protection of morality": it did not exist. One newspaper even published the story of a brawl, which never occurred, between members of the cult and those of the committee. The same committee that recently sent newsrooms a video with images of an alleged black mass that included a human sacrifice. Tg Lazio showed the tape but not the images. Studio Aperto, however, showed them: just a small flame and strange litanies in the background and the blood-curdling screams of a girl (she was supposed to be the sacrificed virgin). In the TV7 programme In coda, Gianluca Nicoletti, along with journalist Loredana Lipperini, an expert in counterculture, will expose the hoax by analyzing the original video, which ends with a tarantella. — "TV7, la messa nera di Luther Blissett", Il manifesto) Connected to the satanic pranks in Viterbo was the publication in 1997 of the pamphlet Lasciate che i bimbi. Pedofilia: un pretesto per la caccia alle streghe, an essay analyzing the media lynching of Bolognese Satanist Marco Dimitri, who was unjustly accused of sexual assault and ritual abuse of a minor. The book was itself the subject of legal action and a trial. In 1997, Blissett also spread the false news of the suicide of Susanna Tamaro, who at that time was at the height of her popularity after the publication of Va' dove ti porta il cuore.

Between 1998 and 2000, Italian art magazines such as Tema Celeste and Flash Art began to report about the activities of Darko Maver, a hitherto unknown radical Serbian performance artist who disseminated hyper-realistic replicas of dismembered bodies in public spaces and hotel rooms across the former Yugoslavia. The magazines and a website called Free Art Campaign reported that the artist was arrested by the Serbian authorities for his performances, which were meant to offer a scathing meditation on the hyperreality and media representation of the Yugoslav Wars; before the exhibition, the artist's death in a NATO bombing was announced. On 30 April 1999, the Free Art Campaign announced that Maver was found dead in a prison cell in Podgorica, Montenegro. In March 2000, after alternative art spaces such as Kapelica Gallery in Ljubljana, Forte Prenestino in Rome, and major art venues like the Venice Biennale set up a posthumous gallery, dedicated retrospectives, and paid tribute to the artist, the Luther Blissett Project, along with the newborn net art collective 0100101110101101.org (later revealed to be the New York City-based duo of artists Eva and Franco Mattes), announced that Maver was himself a work of art. Also between 1998 and 2000, a fake Vatican website (vaticano.org) created by Luther Blissett remained online. Its graphics were identical to those of the official website (vatican.va) but its intent was satirical and misleading, containing a fake programme for the Jubilee 2000 and manipulated texts of papal encyclicals.

A month before the appearance on the bookshelves of Harry Potter and the Deathly Hallows (2007), an email was sent to the Full Disclosure mailing list. In the e-mail, a self-declared group of Catholic hackers purportedly gave away the ending of the book, declaring they violated the computer systems of Bloomsbury Publishing (exclusive publisher of the Harry Potter books) to obtain it. The e-mail quoted Joseph Ratzinger's words against Harry Potter. The news escalated from niche IT security mailing lists to mainstream media outlets, and in about 48 hours it was run by CNN, BBC, Reuters, and over 10,000 blogs who reported the claim. Three days after, Luther Blissett claimed responsibility for the hoax in a public email that described how easily the media could be manipulated and how this could be used for psyops purposes. The revelation was ignored by most media outlets, with the notable exception of Noticiasdot, which published an interview with Luther Blissett. The psyop may be the cause of the 5% drop of Bloomsbury Publishing stock quoted on the London Stock Exchange. On 30 September 2015, within the context of the European migrant crisis, Luther Blissett claimed responsibility for a hoax against Ryanair, consisting of the company's false announcement that it intended to carry undocumented refugees on its flights. (Note: When contacted by email for clarification, the reply (signed Luther Blissett) read: "Design fiction" is a method that uses narrative scenarios to imagine, explain, and raise questions about possible future scenarios for society: this is the point of the RyanFair campaign. Obviously, it's completely fictional: you could label it a hoax. But it's a possible reality. Some people can fly, others can't: this is why migrants swim, go to sea, and drown. Because other people don't want them to use other means of transport. I'm not talking about Ryanair, I'm talking about the rules, the people who make the rules, and those who respect them. In this universe, 3,000 people died in the Mediterranean Sea in 2015. For a few hours, other people could imagine a parallel universe. Enough with reality, we have to move beyond it. We have to change the rules or break them. — Luther Blissett)

== Alleged role of Umberto Eco ==
The German weekly Der Spiegel in its 25 May 1997 issue, discussing the spread of Blissett in Europe, listed writer and semiologist Umberto Eco as one of the project's founders. That same year, a pamphlet titled "Umberto Eco's Multiple Names: The Hegemony of the Left from Gramsci to the Internet" was published online and as a stapled booklet. This anti-Blissett publication, signed "K.M.A." and attributed to far-right circles, was published online. The booklet ascribes the entire Luther Blissett Project to a secret circle of semiologists at the University of Bologna, whose alleged leader was Eco. The publication of Q encouraged new comparisons and connections. On 25 February 1999, Panorama reported: "Dense mystery and splashes of venom surround Q, a colossal historical and imaginative novel by Luther Blisset [sic] to be released this spring in the Stile libero Einaudi series... It's impossible to know more: in keeping with the Luther Blisset [sic] project, the real authors remain in the shadows and the publisher is keeping quiet. Faithful to their anti-copyright stance, Blisset's followers enjoy bouncing crazy hypotheses around the ponderous tome: behind the multiple identities there might be a group of goliards or a heretical prelate. And some are even going so far as to name Umberto Eco himself."

On 6 March 1999, Il Messaggero reported a denial by Eco, stating: "It's pointless to ask who is hiding behind the Luther Blissett of Q. Is it Umberto Eco (who has already denied it)? Is it Bifo? A group of young people from the University of Bologna? He's certainly laughing, sipping coffee, like the rebellious protagonist of his novel, at the court of some powerful man." On that same day, La Repubblica published an interview by Loredana Lipperini with the four authors of Q, with a preface: "The story ... appealed to more than one illustrious reader who was able to preview it, and it fueled what was predictable: the hunt for the true author, until now identified with heretical prelates and, of course, Umberto Eco. Things are different. The authors are four, and they have been part of the 'Luther Blissett Project' since its inception." In 2021, Wu Ming 1 revealed that "Umberto Eco's The Multiple Name" was itself a Blissett hoax, that K.M.A. simply stood for "Kiss My Ass" and that "the real author of the pamphlet is a member of the Luther Blissett Project, now a media philosopher, a respected lecturer at a German university and a theorist of so-called 'accelerationism'."

== Legal issues ==
In 1997, the Castelvecchi publishing house published the book Lasciate che i bimbi. Pedofilia: un pretesto per la caccia alle streghe under the name of the Luther Blissett collective. The book addressed the legal case of Marco Dimitri and the Children of Satan (as the affair was known), which resulted in an acquittal of all charges after years of investigations and trials. The book was positively reviewed in several national newspapers. According to Il Sole 24 Ore on 25 January 1998, the book showed "the errors to which the obsession with pedophilia and the desire for revenge can lead, especially if the mania is fueled by the press's desire for scoops ... a call for common sense and caution, and a banishment of the perverse logic of the scapegoat." La Repubblica praised the book as "a healthy antidote to the collective hysteria that ... has gripped the entire universe of communication". Nonetheless, the book caused a scandal, being accused of pedophilia, was censored on Rome's civic network, and was banned by the Telefono Arcobalen association led by Fortunato Di Noto, an anti-pedofilia activist priest.

In the book, the collective strongly attacked Lucia Musti, the public prosecutor in the Children of Satan trial. Musti filed a civil suit—for the "uncivilized language" and "the harmfulness of the statements and judgments contained" in the book—against the publishing house and the two internet providers who distributed the book online. At the trial, Castelvecchi presented a document showing that the publishing contract was signed on behalf of the Luther Blissett collective by Roberto Bui (later known as Wu Ming 1, who reconstructed the affair in detail in the book La Q di complotto). Consequently, the latter was also sued. On 14 June 2001, the Civil Court of Bologna sentenced Castelvecchi and the two Internet providers, ordering them to reimburse Musti for the sum of 80 million lire, thirty of which were due to the publishing house. Bui was sentenced, in conjunction with Castelvecchi, to reimburse 50% of the sum.

== Works ==
- Mind Invaders (Italian, 1995)
- "Guy Debord è morto davvero" (Italian, 1995; English edition: "Guy Debord Is Really Dead")
- Totò, Peppino e la guerra psichica 2.0 (Toto, Peppino and the Psychic War 2.0), AAA edition, 1996, ISBN 88-86828-00-4
- Green Apocalypse (with Stewart Home, 1996)
- Anarchist Integralism (1997)
- Handbuch der Kommunikationsguerilla (Handbook of a Communications Fighter, German, 1997, with autonome a.f.r.i.k.a. gruppe and Sonja Brünzels)
- Q (Italian, 1999)
- Luther Blissett – The Open Pop Star (Italian, 1999 compilation album of electronic/experimental music by various artists)
- The Invisible College (2002)
- Numerous software recipes in the Python Cookbook edited by Alex Martelli and published by O'Reilly and Associates

== See also ==
- 54 (novel)

== Bibliography ==
=== Articles ===
- Arie, Sophie; Ezard, John (28 August 2003). "From Watford striker to top novelist – but only the name's the same". The Guardian.
- "Breve storia di Luther Blissett". Il Post (in Italian). 1 February 2018. Archived from the original on 5 February 2018.
- Büsch, Thomas (10 October 2013). "The Way of the Guerrilla". InEnArt.
- "The concept of Cary". The Guardian. 20 May 2005.
- Gambetta, Daniele (26 February 2019). "Pretendi la terza era spaziale". Not (in Italian). NERO.
- Longhi, Lorenzo (16 December 2015). "Chi è Luther Blissett? In principio era il calciatore". Atlante Magazine Treccani (in Italian). Archived from the original on 14 March 2018.
- "Luther Blisset – anarchist hero". BBC News. 9 March 1999. Archived from the original on 11 January 2026.
- McLean, Craig McLean (April 2003). "It's A Funny Old Game: Footballer Luther Blissett has become a hero to Italian anarchists. Why?". Word Magazine – via Wu Ming Foundation.
- Messina, Dino (15 May 1999). "Chi si nasconde dietro Luther Blissett?". Io Donna (in Italian). p. 93 – via Wu Ming Foundation.
- Naylor, Tony (14 September 1997). "A shopper's guide to cultural terrorism". The Independent. Archived from the original on 21 January 2009.
- Owen, Richard (9 March 1999). "The name of the footballer cited in literary mystery". The Times. Archived from the original on 12 October 2025 – via [ L u t h e r B l i s s e t t . n e t ].
- Santangelo, Stefano (6 September 2017). "'Ufo al Popolo!' e rave nello spazio – Breve storia dei 'comunisti spaziali' italiani". Vice Italia (in Italian).
- Severgnini, Chiara (6 October 2015). "La bufala di Ryanair che fa volare i profughi senza visto". La Stampa (in Italian). Archived from the original on 4 October 2022.

=== Books ===
- Ciani, Piermario (2000). Piermario Ciani. Dal great complotto a Luther Blissett (in Italian). AAA Edizioni. ISBN 978-88-86828-29-1 – via Google Books.
- Deseriis, Marco (2011). "'Lots of Money Because I am Many:' The Luther Blissett Project and the Multiple-Use Name Strategy". In Firat, Begüm Özden; Kuryel, Aylin (eds.). In Cultural Activism: Practices, Dilemmas and Possibilities. Amsterdam: Rodopi. pp. 65–94. ISBN 978-90-420-2982-8 – via Academia.edu; Google Books.
- Deseriis, Marco (2015). Improper Names: Collective Pseudonyms from the Luddites to Anonymous. University of Minnesota Press. p. 296. ISBN 978-1-4529-4507-1.
- Dogheria, Duccio; Zingoni, Silvano (2021). Luther Blissett. Bibliografia di una guerra psichica (in Italian). Pitigliano: Le Strade Bianche di Stampa Alternativa. OCLC 1310250150 – via Internet Archive.
- Gittlitz, A. M. (2020). I Want to Believe: Posadism, UFOs and Apocalypse Communism. Pluto Books. ISBN 978-1-78680-620-8 – via Google Books.
- Home, Stewart (2010). Assalto alla cultura. Le avanguardie artistico-politiche: lettrismo, situazionismo, fluxus, mail art (in Italian). ShaKe. ISBN 978-88-88865-90-4 – via Google Books.

=== Journals ===
- Deseriis, Marco (2010). "Lots of Money Because I am Many: The Luther Blissett Project and the Multiple-Use Name Strategy" (PDF). Thamyris/Intersecting (21): 65–94. Archived from the original (PDF) on 24 March 2012 – via TheThing.it.
- Longhi, Lorenzo; Molinari, Alberto (December 2023). "I dieci giorni che sconvolsero il calcio. Il caso calciopoli nella rappresentazione della stampa". Bibliomanie. Letterature, storiografie, semiotiche (in Italian). 56 (4). doi:10.48276/issn.2280-8833.10949. ISSN 2280-8833. Archived (PDF) from the original on 9 March 2024.

=== Luther Blissett Project ===
- Berto, Ilaria (15 February 2015). "Intervista a Wu Ming 2". La Chiave di Sophia (in Italian). Archived from the original on 14 May 2023.
- "Darko Maver: The Great Art Swindle". 0100101110101101.org. 2001. Archived from the original on 29 September 2011.
- "Dichiarazione dei diritti". Rivista Mondiale di Guerra Psichica (in Italian) (3, Winter 1995–1996). 1995. Archived from the original on 15 January 2025 – via [ L u t h e r B l i s s e t t . n e t ].
- Jenkins, Henry (4 October 2006). "How Slapshot Inspired a Cultural Revolution (Part One): An Interview with the Wu Ming Foundation". Pop Junctions. Archived from the original on 4 December 2025.
- Jenkins, Henry (5 October 2006). "How Slapshot Inspired a Cultural Revolution (Part Two): An Interview with the Wu Ming Foundation". Pop Junctions. Archived from the original on 2 October 2025.
- "Prologue". [ L u t h e r B l i s s e t t . n e t ]. 2000. Archived from the original on 17 January 2026.
- "Menzogna/Verità. L'insurrezione invisibile: il caso Luther Blissett". Rapporto Italia 1999 (in Italian). Eurispes Institute. 1999. Archived from the original on 7 July 2025 – via [ L u t h e r B l i s s e t t . n e t ].
- "Seppoku". [ L u t h e r B l i s s e t t . n e t ]. Bologna. 6 September 1999. Archived from the original on 18 August 2002.
- Wu Ming 1 (2003). "Notes on the Metaphors of Italian Social Conflict". In Jakobsen, Howard; Slater (eds.). Inside Laboratory Italy. London: Infopool. Archived from the original on 8 November 2024 – via Wu Ming Foundation.

=== Music ===
- "Luther Blissett: The Open Pop Star". [ L u t h e r B l i s s e t t . n e t ]. 2002. Archived from the original on 7 July 2025.

=== Talks ===
- Stalder, Felix (22–23 February 2000). Digital Identities Patterns in Information Flows (Speech). Intermedia Departement, Academy of Fine Arts, Budapest.

=== Theses ===
- Di Maio, Fabrizio (August 2019). The dialectical relationship of power and freedom in Luther Blissett's and Wu Ming's historical novels (PDF) (PhD thesis). Department of Modern Languages School of Languages, Cultures, Art History and Music College of Arts and Law at the University of Birmingham.

=== Videos ===
- Lost and Found Series 3, episode 5 of 6. Short Cuts. BBC Radio 4. 25 June 2013. Archived from the original on 30 June 2013.
- Luther Blissett fantasy footballer. Fantasy Football League. 30 June 2004. Archived from the original on 8 January 2007 – via YouTube.
