= Monty Cantsin =

Multiple-use name with close ties to Neoism

Monty Cantsin is a multiple-use name that anyone can adopt, but has close ties to Neoism. Monty Cantsin was originally conceived as an "open pop star." In a philosophy anticipating that of free software and open source, anyone could perform in his name and thus contribute to and participate in his fame and achievements.

== History ==
The name was coined in 1978 by the critic, prankster and Mail Artist David Zack as a pen name for the Latvian-born poet and singer Maris Kundzins. It further alludes to:

- Martial Canterel, the wizard-hero of Raymond Roussel's novel Locus Solus;
- Monte Capanno, a Northern Italian villa near Perugia where Zack had taught a San Jose State College study and living community in 1970;
- Monte Cazazza, a Californian performance artist and industrial music performer;
- Istvan Kantor, the second bearer of the name;
- "Monty can't sing";
- "Monty can't sin", a reference to religious free spirit movements which collectively adopted the names of Jesus or saints.

Zack called upon his correspondents to adopt the name Monty Cantsin. His suggestion was taken up in 1979 by the Hungarian-Canadian performance artist Istvan Kantor, who amalgamated the name into Neoism. As the shared identity of all Neoists, Monty Cantsin was transformed from a "pop star" to a radical identity experiment occupying the everyday life of Neoists and culminating in frequently extremist ways at Neoist Apartment Festivals ("APTs"). The "open pop star" concept lived on in a series of electropop and industrial music albums and performances of, mainly, Istvan Kantor.

== Influences ==
Later multiple names like Karen Eliot and Luther Blissett drew inspiration from Monty Cantsin and Neoism, but intentionally avoided association with physical persons, being conceived either as mere signatures (Eliot), collective media phantoms (Blissett) or multiple single collective experiments.

== Publications ==
- Cantsin, Monty, ed. (1984). Neoist Book (PDF).
