= Istvan Kantor =

Canadian performance and video artist, industrial music and electropop singer

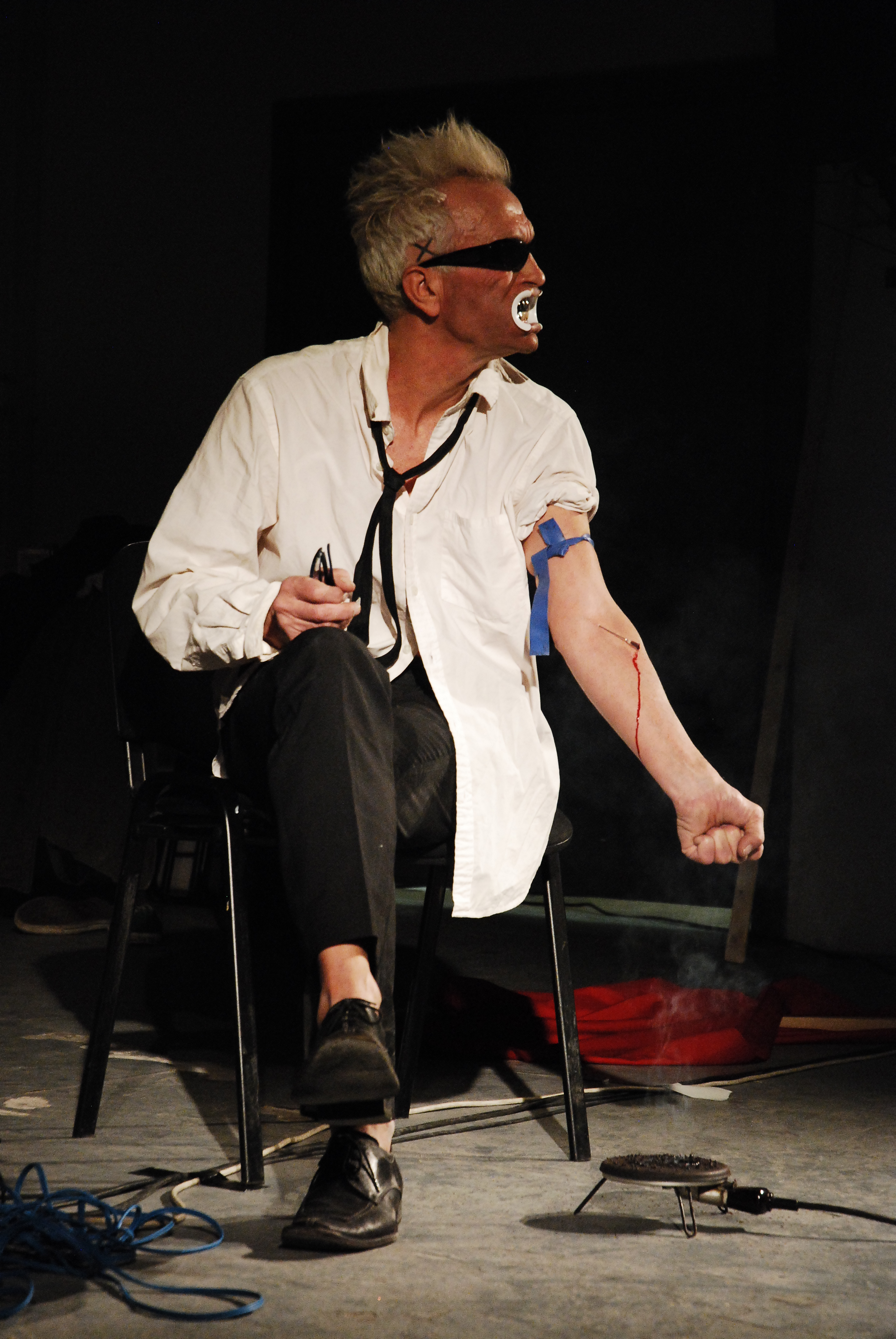
Istvan Kantor

Istvan Kantor (a.k.a. "Monty Cantsin", and "Amen!") (Hungarian: Kántor István; born August 27, 1949, Hungary) is a Canadian performance and video artist, industrial music and electropop singer, and one of the early members of Neoism.

== Life ==
Kantor was born in Hungary on August 27, 1949. In the 1970s, he studied medicine, but also participated in the underground arts scene of communist Budapest that centered on the art historian László Beke.

== Work ==
=== Early work ===
In 1976, at the Young Art Club in Budapest, Cantsin met the American prankster and mail artist David Zack. Zack suggested the idea of adopting the multiple identity Monty Cantsin, which Kantor accepted, to the extent that it became chiefly associated with him. Returning to Montreal, he organized a Mail Art show, "The Brain in the Mail", and in 1979 founded the Neoism movement. Soon afterwards, Neoism expanded into an international subcultural network that collectively used the Monty Cantsin identity.

=== Blood performances ===
Kantor's own work in the late 1970s and early 1980s consisted most notably of the "Blood Campaign", an ongoing series of performances in which he takes his own blood and splashes it onto walls, canvases or into the audience. At the same time, he continued to work within the Neoist network, co-organizing and participating in a series of Neoist festivals, which began as "Apartment Festivals", which were also called simply "APTs".

His more controversial works involve vandalism and gore, painting large X's in his own blood on the walls of modern art museums including next to two Picasso paintings at the Museum of Modern Art (MoMA) in 1988 and at the Jeff Koons retrospective at the Whitney Museum in 2016. In doing so he has been banned from some art galleries, a status he holds with pride. In 2004, he threw a vial of his own blood on a wall beside a sculpture of Michael Jackson by Paul McCarthy in the Hamburger Bahnhof contemporary art museum of Berlin. Although his later work has been dismissed as a simple vandalism by some parts of the media. Curator Laura O'Reilly, commenting on Istvan Kantors writing "Monty Cantsin" on a piece by artist Nelson Saiers in the Hole Shop gallery in New York, said "There's a fine line between pissing on someone else's piece as a form self expression – if you're going to call that art."

=== Robotic art ===
Past work also includes noise installations and performances with electrically modified file cabinets. He also founded the "Machine Sex Action Group" which realizes theatrical cyber-futuristic body performances in an S/M style. The human body in its relation to machines, explored both in its apocalyptic and subversive potentials remains a major theme of his work.

== Awards ==
In March 2004 he was awarded the Canadian Governor General's Award in Visual and Media Arts.
