= Janine Niépce =

French photographer and journalist

- Self-portrait by Niépce
- Born: February 12, 1921; Meudon, France
- Died: August 5, 2007 (aged 86); Paris, France
- Known for: Photography
- Spouse: Claude Jaeger (m. 1946)
- Website: www.janineniepce.com

Janine Niépce (February 12, 1921 – August 5, 2007) was a French photographer and journalist. Her career spanned developing films for the French Resistance to covering the women's liberation movement in the 1970s.

== Biography ==
Janine Niépce was born February 12, 1921, in Meudon, France. She is a distant relative of Nicéphore Niépce, the pioneer of photography. In 1944, she graduated from the Sorbonne. She was a liaison officer involved with the liberation of Paris after World War II. In 1946 she became a professional photographer. She and the Swiss-French Sabine Weiss, a near contemporary, worked as the only women photojournalists at Rapho amongst Robert Doisneau, Édouard Boubat, Denis Brihat, Jean Dieuzaide, Bill Brandt, Ken Heyman, Izis, André Kertész, Yousuf Karsh, Jacques Henri Lartigue, Willy Ronis, Emile Savitry, Fouad Elkoury. She was influenced by Henri Cartier-Bresson.

In the 1970s, her work focused particularly on the women's liberation movement.

In 1981 Niépce was named Chevalier des Arts et des Lettres. In 1985 she became a Knight of the Legion d'Honor.

She died August 5, 2007.

== Publications ==
Janine Niépce has published at least 20 books of photographs, the most recent ones are:

- Niépce Duras (Éditions Actes Sud, 1992)
- Les années femmes (Éditions de la Martinière, 1993)
- Mes années campagne (Éditions de la Martinière, 1994)
- Images d’une vie (Éditions de la Martinière, 1995)
- Les vendanges (Éditions Hoëbeke, 2000)
- Françaises, Français, le goût de vivre (Éditions Imprimerie Nationale Actes Sud, 2005)

== Exhibitions ==
- 2003 Debelleyme Gallery, exhibition sale of signed prints
- 2004 Sale at the exhibition gallery Artcurial during the Mois de la Photo
- 2006 Exhibition, "Douce France" at the Museum of Auxerre.
