= Sabine Weiss (photographer) =

Swiss-French photographer (1924–2021)

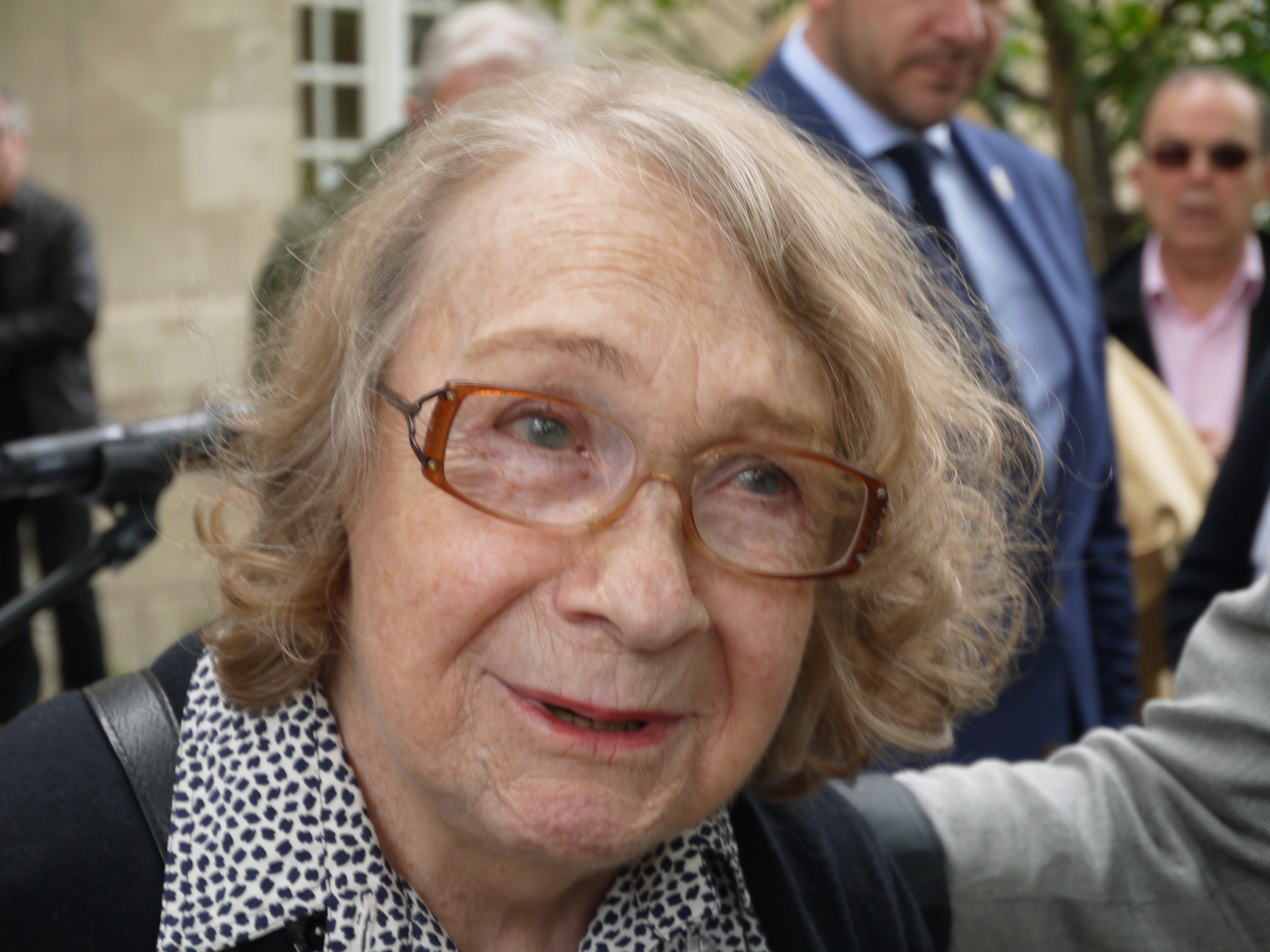
- Weiss in 2016
- Born: Sabine Weber; 23 January 1924; Saint-Gingolph, Canton of Valais, Switzerland
- Died: 28 December 2021 (aged 97); Paris, France
- Known for: Photography
- Movement: Humanist photography

Sabine Weiss (née Weber; 23 January 1924 – 28 December 2021) was a Swiss-French photographer active in the French humanist photography movement, along with Robert Doisneau, Willy Ronis, Édouard Boubat, and Izis. She was born in Switzerland and became a naturalised French citizen in 1995.

== Early life and training ==
Sabine Weber was born on 23 January 1924 in Saint-Gingolph, Switzerland. Her father was a chemical engineer who made artificial pearls from fish scales. The family lived adjacent to the border post and left Saint-Gingolph while she was still a child. Attracted at a young age by photography, she stated around 2007:

I realized very young that photography would be my means of expression. I was more visual than intellectual ... I was not very good at studying. I left high school, I left on a summer day on a bicycle.

Weiss began to photograph in 1932 with a bakelite camera bought with her pocket money and made contact prints on printing-out paper on her windowsill. Her father supported her in her choice, and she later learned photographic technique, from 1942 to 1946, from Frédéric Boissonnas, a studio photographer in Geneva. After this apprenticeship, she received the Swiss qualification in photography in 1945.

== Paris ==
Weiss moved to Paris in 1946 and became Willy Maywald's assistant:

When I came to Paris, I was able to work at Maywald, whom a friend had recommended to me. I worked there in conditions unimaginable today, but with him I understood the importance of natural light. Natural light as a source of emotion.

Maywald was working at that time on the first floor of a shed on 22 Jacob Street which belonged to an antiques dealer, and that had neither water nor telephone. This work nevertheless allowed her to rub shoulders with the 'who's who' of Paris of the time. She published her first photo report at the age of 21 in 1945. She thus attended the opening of the house of Dior and the presentation of the first collection at 37 Avenue Montaigne. In 1949, she traveled to Italy and met the American painter Hugh Weiss, whom she married on September 23, 1950. The couple adopted a daughter, Marion. She opened her own studio. Her photographs testify to the optimism of the post-Liberation years: "It was a beautiful period. We were between the end of the German occupation and the beginning of Americanization. People came out of a terrible ordeal and thought they could rebuild everything", she said.

She worked in various sectors: passionate about music, she portrayed the big names in music (Stravinsky, Britten, Casals, Getz) but also those of literature and art (Léger, Pougny, Giacometti, Rauschenberg, Jan Voss, Dubuffet, Sagan), cinema (Moreau), and fashion (Chanel). She also worked for several magazines and newspapers known in the United States and Europe for advertising and press orders (Vogue, Paris Match, Life, Time, Town and Country, Holiday, Newsweek, Picture Post, and Die Woche etc.). Her attention shifted toward documentary photography and she traveled not only in the United States but also in Egypt, India, Morocco, and Myanmar.

== Rapho agency ==
From 1950, Weiss was represented by Agence Rapho, the leading French press agency managing the work of Robert Doisneau. He offered her a place in the agency after a meeting in the office of the director of Vogue. She befriended artists such as Cocteau, Utrillo, Rouault, and Lartigue.

Among colleagues Doisneau, Boubat, Brihat, Dieuzaide, Brandt, Ken Heyman, Izis, Kertész, Karsh, Lartigue, Ronis, Savitry, and Elkoury, the only other woman at the Rapho agency was Janine Niépce. Nevertheless, the fact that Weiss was one of so few women then forging an independent career in photography was not a problem. Photojournalist Hans Silvester, who worked with her on a story on the people of Omo (Ethiopia), commented:

Although she is in a very masculine environment, she has really managed to be accepted immediately, to establish herself as what she is since: a very great photographer whom I esteem and admire“

Weiss's street photography, of children playing in the wasteland of her neighbourhood, Porte de Saint-Cloud and of Paris and its daily life, was produced independently of her magazine work, for love, and embraces the philosophy of humanist photography. At 28 she was recognised by Edward Steichen's inclusion of her in his "Post-War European Photography" at the Museum of Modern Art (MoMA). In 1954, the Art Institute of Chicago devoted a solo exhibition to her which toured the USA. Then Steichen included three of her photographs in the MoMA exhibition The Family of Man, which travelled the world and was seen by nine million visitors. The pictures typify those she took for herself: Intérieur d'église au Portugal ("Interior of a church in Portugal") of 1954 shows a child in white kneeling on the light-dappled tiled floor, face upturned in question toward her barefoot mother, who, like the surrounding phalanx of figures, is dressed in black; the exuberant Un bal champêtre avec une accordéoniste sur la table ("Village dance with an accordion player on the table"), also 1954; and Un enfant tenant un épi qui fait des étincelles in which a child gleefully thrusts a sparkler almost into her lens. She commented:

I photograph to preserve the ephemeral, fix chance, to keep in an image what will disappear: gestures, attitudes, objects which are testimonies of our passing.

In 1957, Weiss created a series of photographs of the painter Kees van Dongen, whom she met through her husband, and on impulse the trio bought a small shed there overlooking the ruins of the castle at Grimaud. They enlarged the house in 1969 and stayed regularly until the death of her husband in 2007.

In 1983, Weiss obtained a scholarship from the French Ministry of Culture and carried out a study on the Copts of Egypt. In her late fifties, she participated in a longitudinal photographic study, a kind of 'Mass Observation', of a small new town near Nice called Carros-Ie-Neuf over several years with Jean Dieuzaide and Guy le Querrec, working with sociologist Pierre Bourdieu and joined briefly by Leonard Freed. The project was shown at the 1984 Rencontres d'Arles festival as 'Urbain, Trop Urbain?' In 1992, the Ministry granted her another scholarship to document Réunion.

Her photographs are distributed by the agency Gamma-Rapho. In 2017, Weiss donated her entire archive, which contained 200,000 negatives, 7,000 contact sheets, around 2,700 vintage prints and 2,000 late prints, 3,500 prints, and 2,000 slides to the Musée de l'Élysée, Lausanne.

In 2020, she won Kering's Women In Motion Photography Prize.

== Personal life and death ==
Weiss died on 28 December 2021, at the age of 97 at her residence in Paris.

== Publications ==
- J'aime le théâtre, de Catherine Valogne, Rencontres, Suisse, 1962, 301.p. In-12, illustrated with B&W photography.
- A week in Daniel's World: France, Sabine Weiss and Hugh Weiss, 1969, Crowell-Collier Press. ISBN 9780027925906
- En passant, Contrejour, France, 1978
- Marchés et Foires de Paris, ACE, France, 1982
- Intimes convictions, by Claude Nori, Contrejour, France, 1989
- Hadad, Peintres, Cercle d'Art, 1992
- Vu à Pontoise, municipales, 1992
- La Réunion, galerie Vincent, Saint Pierre, 1995
- Bulgarie, Fata Morgana, 1996
- Giacometti, Fata Morgana, 1997
- Des enfants, text by Marie Nimier, Hazan, 1997, (ISBN 2-85025-574-2)
- Poussettes, charrettes et roulettes, Musée de Bièvres, 2000
- André Breton, text by Julien Gracq, Fata Morgana, 2000
- Sabine Weiss soixante ans de photographie, by Jean Vautrin and Weiss, La Martinière, 2003
- Claudia de Medici, 2004
- Musiciens des villes et des campagnes, par Weiss, Gabriel Bauret et Ingrid Jurzak (Filigranes), 2006, (ISBN 9 782350 460741)
- See and Feel, ABP (Pays-Bas), 2007
- "Masques et Rites, Burkina Faso", in the revue d'art TROU, no. 20, 2010
- l'Œil intime, Presses de e-Center, 2011, (ISBN 978-2-35130-056-5)
- l'Œil intime, Impression Escourbiac, new edition October 2014, (ISBN 978-2-95493-890-5)
- Sabine Weiss, co-edition with Jeu de Paume / La Martinière, preface by Marta Gili, text by Virginie Chardin, June 2016

== Exhibitions ==
- "Sabine Weiss. La poesia dell’istante", La Casa dei Tre Oci, Venice, Italy, 11 March 2022 - 23 October 2022
