= André Steiner (photographer) =

Hungarian born French photographer and photojournalist (1901–1978)

- Born: Andras Steiner; 9 December 1901; Miháld, Austria-Hungary
- Died: 29 September 1978 (aged 76); Paris, France
- Education: Vienna University of Technology
- Known for: Photography
- Spouse: Lily

André Steiner (9 December 1901 – 29 September 1978) was a French photographer.

== Early life ==
Andras (later known as 'André' in France) Steiner was born in Miháld in Hungary into a Jewish family. After the end of World War I and the proclamation of the Republic of Hungary, at age 17 he chose exile in Vienna, Austria. There he attended the Vienna University of Technology to study electrical engineering and was made assistant to photography historian Josef Maria Eder who encouraged him to take up the medium and, through the Leitz firm, provided him with an early Leica model to test. An accomplished sportsman Steiner, through his involvement in Hakoah, Vienna's Jewish sports circle, and as one of the trainers of the prestigious swim team to which she belonged, he met Léa Sasson then aged thirteen.

== Paris ==
Despite an age difference of 9 years and conflicting origins; she the daughter of a Sephardic Istanbul Jewish family, and he a Hungarian and Ashkenazi, they married in Hungary, when he was 27 and Lily had reached eighteen, and arrived in Paris as husband and wife where they adopted French names André and Lily. He was a Decathlon champion at the Worldwide University Games of that year held in the city. Daughter Nicole (Steiner-Bajolet) was born in 1934.

== Photographer ==
At first André worked as a sound engineer with Althsom until 1932 for Paramount Studios and the Phototone Society, and collaborating with Gasparcolor on the development of colour motion picture film. These photography-related experiences inspired Steiner's desire to become a professional photographer.

Setting up a commercial studio in 1933, he preferred to work alone rather than join the considerable Hungarian photographic community in Paris which included André Kertész, Brassaï, Robert Capa, Nora Dumas, Ergy Landau, Ervin Marton, Émeric Fehér, Lucien Hervé, Rogi André, Rosie Rey and others lesser known. However Warren points out that both he and Kertesz "experimented with distortion techniques to create startling images of human flesh;" Steiner's, in his series entitled Anamorphose (Anamorphosis), being limited to hands and faces and not the nudes that Kertesz produced. His scientific approach to the medium through his technical background in engineering influenced his precise and perfectionist photography, especially in modernist studies of cast shadows from transparent or translucent materials.

An interest in culture physique resulted in his nude studies, most often in collaboration with Lily, until their separation in 1938. Warren notes that in his nudes "The pose of the model, the framing, and the lighting are Steiner’s main parameters. Through lighting, flesh itself becomes light, detaching from a dark background. As he re-centers his compositions, Steiner isolates, fragments, and redefines the human body as pure plastic form. But, as opposed to Man Ray, who also uses re-centering in order to interpret the human body, there is no surrealist ambition in Steiner’s work."

== Magazine work ==
He was a contributor to 15 issues, including nudes and cover pictures, of Paris Sex-Appeal 1934–35, and frequently to Art et Médecine during 1933–1937, firstly of photographs of flowers in the snow, summer beaches in 1935, for a feature entitled 'Femmes' a picture of Lily breast-feeding their child, and such subjects as architecture, cloud studies, aviation and ice hockey. Sports photographs he made during a trip to Morocco in 1933 were included in Photographie 1934, edited by Arts et métiers graphiques and attracted the attention of Lucien Vogel at Vu magazine, which featured his cinematic sequence of a swimmer diving, full page in its July 1936 edition and 32 other stories between 1933 and 1940. His work was selected for the International Exhibition of Contemporary Photography at the Musée des Arts décoratifs in Paris in 1936 and was subsequently specially commissioned for reportage by magazines Vu, Paris-soir, Marianne, Harper's Bazaar, Vogue and others. In 1939 he made a series of the Swedish dancer Lisa Fonssagrives (who modelled for and married Irving Penn). He also profited from production of advertising and architectural photography.

== World War II ==
In the Second World War, Steiner joined the French Air Army and was made a French citizen, later becoming a member of the Resistance among numerous young Jewish-Hungarian artists and intellectuals, including the painter Sándor Józsa, sculptor István Hajdú (Etienne Hajdu), journalists László Kőrösi and Imre Gyomrai, another photographer Lucien Hervé (by then also a French citizen), and the printer Ladislas Mandel.

== Post-war and later career ==
The War delayed publication of a book of nude studies until 1947, he then produced aesthetic illustrations for a fine 1948 photogravure monograph on the sculpture of Rodin, but abandoned exhibition and publication of artistic photography to concentrate on applied work in the fields of industrial and medical imaging for which he also acted as a consultant.

Steiner died of a heart attack in Paris on 29 September 1978.

== Exhibitions ==
- 1934 Groupe annuel des photographes (Annual Group of Photographers); Galerie de la Pléiade; Paris, France
- 1935 La publicité par la photographie (Advertising through Photography); Galerie de la Pléiade; Paris, France
- 1936 Exposition internationale de la photographie contemporaine (International Exhibition of Contemporary Photography); Musée des Arts décoratifs (Pavillon de Marsan); Paris, France
- 1938 Photos de neige (Snow Photographs); Au Grand Atelier; Paris, France
- 1986 La Nouvelle Photographie en France, 1919–1939 (New Photography in France, 1919–1939); Musée Sainte-Croix; Poitiers, France
- 1987 Das verborgene Bild. Geschichte des ma¨nnlichen Akts in der Fotografie des 19 und 20 Jahrhunderts (The Secret Picture. History of the Male Nude Photography of 19th and 20th Centuries); Kunstverein; Frankfort-am-Main, German
- 1989 Visions du sport, photographies 1860–1960 (Visions of Sports, Photographs 1860–1960); Centre national de la Photographie; Paris, France, France
- 1991 Das Neue Sehen: von der Fotografie am Bauhaus zur Subjektiven Fotografie (The New Vision: from Bauhaus to Subjective Photography); Munich, Germany
- 1997 Anne´es 30 en Europe. Le temps menacant, 1929–1939 (The 1930s in Europe. The threatening Times, 1929–1930); Muse´e d’Art moderne de la Ville de Paris; Paris, France
- 2001 Figures parfaites. Hommage à Emmanuel Sougez (Perfect Figures. Homage to Emmanuel Sougez); Musée de Grenoble; Grenoble, Switzerland2014, 27 February–20 April: Multimedia Art Museum, Moscow
- 2019, 13 April–15 June: La Bascule Du Regard. Les Douches La Galerie, Paris
- 2018, 26 April–27 July: A Luta Continua. The Sylvio Perlstein Collection. Hauser & Wirth, Chelsea, New York
- 2019, 28 November–24 December: Christmas Selection. Les Douches La Galerie, Paris
- 2019–2020, 4 October–4 January: AU REVOIR! Magyar származású fotográfusok Franciaországban ('Au revoir! Photographers of Hungarian Heritage in France'). Castle Museum – Budapest History Museum, Budapest
- 2020, 24 January–14 March: Les Choses de la Vie, Les Douches La Galerie, Paris
- 2021, 11 March–31 July: In Praise of the Hand, Les Douches La Galerie, Paris
- 2022, 18 February–30 April: Bordering the Real: Surrealist Photographs. Les Douches La Galerie, Paris

== Collections ==
- Getty Museum
- Musée Nicéphore Niépce

== Bibliography ==
- Steiner, André (2011). Ce qu'on n'a pas fini d'aimer. François Cheval, Arnaud Cathrine, Musée Nicéphore Niépce. Marseille: Bec en l'air. ISBN 978-2-916073-71-2. OCLC 760990204.
- A.-Henri. Martinie, Rodin, photographs of sculptures by André Steiner, Braun & Cie, 1948
- Steiner, André (1947). 45 nus (in French) (1st ed.). Éditions Sun. OCLC 11175541.
- Domergue, Jean-Gabriel. Foreword. Etudes de nus (Nude Studies). Paris: Tiranty, 1952.
- Besson, George. Nus (Nudes). Paris: Braun, 1953.
- Sougez Emmanuel. ‘‘André Steiner, curieux homme’’ (‘‘Andre´ Steiner, curious Man’’). Camera no. 4, (April 1962): 6–34.
- Photomontages : photographie expèrimentale de l'entre-deux-guerres. Michel Frizot. Paris: Centre National de la Photographie. 1987. ISBN 2-86754-041-0. OCLC 19755585.
- Gautrand, Jean-Claude (1989). Visions du sport : photographies, 1860-1960. [Aix-en-Provence]: Admira. ISBN 2-907658-02-6. OCLC 22892387.
- Bouqueret, Christian (1997). Des années folles aux années noires : la nouvelle vision photographique en France 1920-1940. Paris: Marval. ISBN 2-86234-230-0. OCLC 38317472.
- Photographes : made in Hungary. Károly Kincses, Péter Walter, Natalia Zaremba, Charles Zaremba. [Aix]: Actes Sud. 1998. ISBN 2-7427-1817-6. OCLC 40391330.
- Bouqueret, Christian (1999). André Steiner : l'homme curieux. André Steiner, Musée Sainte-Croix. Paris: Marval. ISBN 2-86234-276-9. OCLC 43837732.
