= Serge de Sazo =

Serge Sazonoff (October 8, 1915 – January 24, 2012), also known as Serge de Sazo, was a Russian born French photographer.

== Biography ==
Serge de Sazo was born at Stavropol (in the province of Don). His father was a colonel in the Cossacks and his mother was the daughter of an industrialist. After living with his family in Turkey, Greece and the United States, he arrived in Paris in 1922 at the age of seven.

He got his first job in 1933 in the magazine VU and there he met and quickly became the assistant of Gaston Paris and joined the Universal press agency for which he produced his first reportage. in 1937 he collaborated with Charles Rado and Raymond Grosset who founded the Rapho agency.

== World War II ==
De Sazo enlisted in the French Army and was a sergeant with the 8 Zouave. Demobilized in 1940, he started working as a freelance reporter for cinema reviews. Living on the Rue de Rivoli and armed with his Rolleiflex, he recorded skirmishes of the liberation of Paris as the Resistance liberated the Town Hall. His pictures were published all over the world, and established his reputation.

== Post-war ==
From 1945 when Parisian night life recommenced, with cabaret, jazz, the music-hall and cinema, and creative artistic activity flourished in the 1950s, he worked as a freelance photojournalist for clients including Air France, V: magazine illustré du Mouvement de libération nationale, Aviation, Icare, His pin-ups and nudes were regularly published in the magazine Paris-Hollywood and are predominant in Paris Sex-Appeal during its brief revival 1950-1, and his naked swimmers appeared in an international exhibition of photographs of women organised by Gens d'Images at the Musée d'Orsay in 1955 and were mentioned, amongst those of Emmanuel Sougez, Jacques Adriaan (U.S.A.), Honjo Mitsuro (Japan) and Mario Finazzi (Italy) in Combat; "One should not miss the underwater ballet of Serge de Sazo".

== Underwater photography ==
While working on a project in 1950 about naturism on the island of Levant, de Sazo met Jean-Albert Föex, previously author of La Fille perpendiculaire photographed by Robert Charroux. Föex introduced him to diving. Enthralled by the gracious movements of the weightless body and wanting to photograph it, he invented a waterproof casing for his Rolleiflex. He used this home-made casing to take the first undersea photographs, with his wife as the subject. After a few minor improvements he photographed a troop of dancers performing under water; “The Mermaids of Levant” was an immediate success. Föex, increasingly interested in the possibility of undersea living, introduced him to the new technology of scuba-diving. He was fascinated by sea flora and wild life, and in 1954 with Föex and Roger Brand, they published the first French magazine dedicated to the undersea world L’aventure sous-marine published until 1981. Subsequently, he divided his time between nudist underwater imagery and work as a press photographer.

== Later career ==
Having retired to the French Alps in the mid 1980s, de Sazo died on 24 January 2012.

== Publications ==
- Nus, photographies d'André De Dienes, Serge De Sazo et Marcel Véronèse, Album No.7, Société Parisienne, 1950
- L'île aux sirènes de J.A. Foex, photographies de S. de Sazo, Édition Optimistes, 1953
- Mon album des profondeurs de Gilbert Doukan, photographies de S. de Sazo, Édition Elsevier,1954
- Exploration sous-marine de la Bible de J.A. Foex, photographies de S. de Sazo, Édition France-Empire, 1955
- Riviera, la nuit, Robert Jacques, photographs by Pierre Manciet and Serge de Sazo, La Pensée Moderne, 1959
- Bonjour Paris by François Brigneau, ouvrage collectif: S. de Sazo, Jacqueline Nièpce, Robert Doisneau etc., Des Éditions Sun, 1969
- Paris, ses poètes, ses chansons, Serge de Sazo and Bernard Delvaille, Éditions Seghers, 1977
- Femme sorciére !, photographies de Serge de Sazo, ouvrage collectif, Édition Ion, 2013
- French Maidens, by Charles Sennet with a photographic supplement by Serge de Sazo, The Naturist, London.
