= Rapho (agency) =

French photo agency

The Rapho agency was founded in Paris in 1933 by Charles Rado (1899–1970), a Hungarian immigrant. Rapho, an acronym formed from Rado-Photo, is one of the oldest press agencies specializing in humanist photography. Rapho initially represented the small group of Hungarian friends and refugee photographers Brassaï, Nora Dumas, Ergy Landau and Ylla.

Forced to close the agency during World War II, Rado left for the U.S. in 1940. He opened a New York City office at 59 East 54th Street, Rapho Guillumette Pictures, with photographer Paul Guillumette. Rapho was reopened in Paris in 1946 by Raymond Grosset.

Rado and Grosset proceeded to gather a number of photographers whom they represented in varying capacities and sometimes shared: Robert Doisneau, Édouard Boubat, Denis Brihat, Jean Dieuzaide, Bill Brandt, Ken Heyman, Izis, André Kertész, Yousuf Karsh, Jacques Henri Lartigue, Janine Niépce, Willy Ronis, Emile Savitry, Fouad Elkoury, and Sabine Weiss.

In 1975, Rapho Guillumette Pictures was absorbed by Photo Researchers. Two years later, Rapho acquired the TOP agency. In 2000, Rapho joined the Hachette Filipacchi Photos Group, which was sold in 2007 and became the photo conglomerate Eyedea. Eyedea, which went bankrupt in 2010, resurfaced that year as Gamma-Rapho, and includes the image collections of Hoa-Qui, TOP, Explorer, and Jacana.
