= André Steiner =

André Steiner may refer to:

- André Steiner (rower) (born 1970), German retired rower
- André Steiner (photographer) (1901–1978), Hungarian-born French photographer and photojournalist

== See also ==
- Andrew Steiner, architect and Jewish resistance activist
