= Paris Sex-Appeal =

French monthly erotic magazine published in Paris (1933 to 1951)

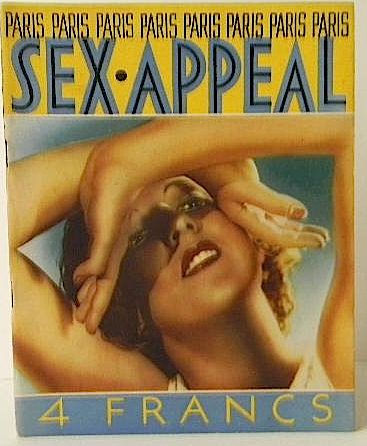
- Paris Sex-Appeal, cover, July 1934
- Editor: Henri François
- Frequency: Monthly
- Publisher: Henri François
- Total circulation: unknown
- Founded: 1933
- Country: France
- Based in: Paris
- Language: French
- ISSN: 2727-5795

Paris Sex-Appeal was a monthly French erotic magazine published in Paris by Henri Francois from 1933 to 1951, though it was suspended during World War II. It featured light French fiction and articles. Illustrations throughout were erotic nudes. Each issue featured a single colour plate.

== Publisher ==
The Paris editorial office was located at 47 avenue Philippe-Auguste, Paris. This address is that of the publishing and printing works of Henri François who owned photogravure machines. He published many technical brochures, posters and aviation magazines. The magazine Mon Paris, son visage sa vie ardente, which appeared in November 1935, had the same address and shared contributors and advertisements with Paris sex-appeal appear there. Meyers also associates with the magazine "Jean Mézerette, an obscure, self-published author of gossipy books denigrating both Hitler and Mussolini whom Paris police files identified as a ‘‘publicist’’ and ‘‘manager of the publication Paris Sex-Appeal.’’

== Title ==
In reference to the origin of its title should be noted that from May 1932, Marie Dubas was all the rage in a “futuristic” show entitled Sex-Appeal Paris 32 at the Casino de Paris produced by Henri Varna with sets by Paul Colin. It was subtitled for a time “the most Parisian magazine”. Agret notes that

In its title, Paris Sex-Appeal appropriates the Anglo-Saxon concept of sex appeal to turn it into a typically gallic quality [to] conform to the French art of seduction and the capital’s reputation as a city of love and flirtation. The word ‘Paris’ hangs at the top of the cover page where it is repeated nine times, like a flashing neon light. It acts less as an indication of a place than as the guarantee of a certain form of licentiousness. Paris becomes identified with sex appeal which is personified, every month, by a different woman on the cover of the magazine.

The title can be seen, in turn, to have had a reverse influence on publications in English; for example, one of the first uses of the phrase 'sex appeal' in Vogue was in an article on the new Paris collections 'Vogue's Eyeview of Paris Sex Appeal,' in the September 1937 issue.

== Content ==
Naughty and light, it played on the stereotype of the "Parisian woman" and on the city of Paris, renowned for its "hot spots", to appeal to a male audience. Its contents were not pornographic. It presented a succession of 'advertorial' articles promoting publications, photographs, films and places referring unambiguously to the world of the night and its pleasures. There are also fictional texts often authored pseudonymously (Pierre Mac Orlan as Sadie Blackeyes, for example, and Ernest de Gengenbach's 'La Satanisme moderne' as 'Jehan Silvius'), and illustrated with photographs and drawings, most credited, in which usually athletic women, and some muscular men, appear more or less naked. Never banned or restricted it was available on newsstands as evidenced by its legal deposit and was distributed by the Nouvelles Messageries de la presse parisienne (NMPP).

== Contributors ==
Among the notable writers and illustrators credited with their true names on the contents page, are Paul Dufau, Henri Falk, Maurice de Lambert, Pit, Paul Reboux, André Salmon and André Warnod, and photographers Jean Moral, Pierre Boucher (photographer) René Zuber, Serge de Sazo, Maria Eisner, Roger Schall, Nora Dumas, André Steiner and the agencies including Schostal and Alliance Photo. Following his Paris de nuit Brassaï published in Paris Sex-Appeal pictures from his Paris intime ("Secret Paris") made in cafés and brothels and backstage at revues and theatres, though the full project was only published in 1976 as The Secret Paris of the 30's.

== Influence ==
The magazine provided surrealist artists with material for their collages; Francis Picabia’s Printemps of 1942-3 was for a long time thought to portray Suzanne and Max Romain, but actually Paris Sex-Appeal was the source of this image, and also as for his Les Baigneuses of 1942, and Georges Hugnet's 1935 The Architect of Magus likewise uses a nude from the magazine, as do others of his collages made in 1947 but not published until 1969. Paris Sex-Appeal was an inspiration also to Hans Bellmer. Clovis Trouille's 1946 reclining nude shown from behind is entitled Oh! Calcutta, Calcutta!; a pun in French from pronunciation of the phrase "oh quel cul t'as" ("oh what a lovely arse you have") and is a close copy in paint from a small reproduction of André Steiner's nude photograph in the July 1935 issue of the magazine.

== Demise ==
Suspended during the war, Paris Sex-Appeal reappeared in 1950, only to be discontinued the following year.
