= Émile Savitry =

- Born: Dupont; 21 January 1903; Saigon, Vietnam
- Died: 30 October 1967 (aged 64); Paris
- Education: École Nationale Supérieure des Arts Décoratifs, Grande Chaumiere Academy of Fine Arts
- Known for: Photography, Painting
- Movement: Surrealism, Humanist photography
- Awards: Prix de la critique, 1962

Émile Savitry (1903–1967) was a French photographer and painter.

== Early life ==
Born in Saigon, in 1903, into the wealthy colonial industrialist family of Felix Marius Alphonse Dupont and Cecile Leonie Audra, Émile renamed himself Savitry to go at age 17 to study painting (1920–1924) at École nationale supérieure des arts décoratifs and at the private Grande Chaumiere Academy of Fine Arts (still located in Paris at 14, Rue de la Grande Chaumiere), until 1924.

== Surrealism ==
Associated with poet Robert Desnos and painter André Derain and the Surrealists, Savitry exhibited in 1929 at dealer Zborowski's gallery a sellout show, the catalogue essay of which was penned by celebrated Surrealist poet Louis Aragon (1897-1982).

However, though on the threshold of artistic fame he decamped to Polynesia. Commentators propose different reasons for this decision; "He had more than one string to his art," wrote Claude Roy in 1972, "painting, photography, travel (and doing nothing). But what did not interest him was to be successful." (and as a wealthy man, despite the 1929 recession, Savitry did not need the proceeds of success); Barbara Creed notes that "The Surrealists saw travel as a means to achieve a state of dépaysement "; while another factor may have been the disagreements between the Surrealists over their association with Communism, which reached a climax with André Breton's letter of provocation to the group, and meeting with them on 11 March 1929, on the issue of working collectively, to which idea Savitry was amongst the majority of the group in responding positively, innocently naming the reluctant, and soon to be expelled, Desnos as a desirable collaborator .

Savitry was accompanied on his journey to the tropics by surrealist painter Georges Malkin and Yvette Ledoux, a young American woman whom he'd just met. On arrival she chose to go with Malkin. Savitry had taken a Gaumont Block-Notes 6x9 camera, so named for its shape and its ingenious sheet magazine (see: https://camera-wiki.org/wiki/Gaumont_Block-Notes), and happened upon a beached 'ghost ship'. Friedrich W. Murnau, in the middle of shooting his ill-fated movie Tabou, was impressed by Savitry's boat picture and engaged him on his team to research Polynesian iconography and to make film stills.

== Photojournalism ==
On return to Paris in 1930 Savitry commenced a career as a photographer, co-founding with Charles Rado, Brassaï and Ergy Landau in 1933 the Rapho agency. For Rapho, he covered the massive refugee influx into the South of France from the Spanish Civil War. His reportage for Match and other magazines also features his close friend Django Reinhardt, whom he met in Toulon and whose installation with his family in Paris he sponsored, introducing Django into the jazz scene at La Boîte à Matelots at 10 rue Fontaine.

From 1932 to 1934, he assisted Brassaï (1899–1984). In February 1939, his reportage on the rue Pigalle theatre precinct is published in Paris Match.

Mobilized in September 1939, he joined the battalion of Engineering in Avignon.

On 2 April 1940, at Hyères, he married the Argentinean painter and illustrator Elsa Henriquez (1915 ?–2010), daughter of Peruvian dancer Helba Huara (1900–1989) and Peruvian journalist Gonzalo More, and through them Savitry met and photographed a number of Argentinian poets and writers. They had a son, Francis "Paco" Dupont.

After the war, he helped to revive the Rapho agency in Paris, joined there by Robert Doisneau and Willy Ronis.

He was later a regular contributor to fashion magazines Vogue, Jardin des Modes and Harper's Bazaar. He was also published in the 1950s in Regards, Visages du Monde, Cavalcade, Point de Vue and Images du Monde, Caliban, Picture Post and Réalités.

== Portraits ==
He is best known for his portraits of mid-century personalities, many of whom were close friends: actors Anouk Aimée, Brigitte Bardot, Pierre Brasseur, Madeleine Renaud, Serge Reggiani and Charlie Chaplin, film directors Jacques Prévert and Marcel Carné, sculptors Alberto Giacometti, Victor Brauner and Oscar Dominiguez, Marcel Jean, Bertold Bartosch, Pierre Loeb, musicians Django Reinhardt, Claude Luter, Édith Piaf, writer Colette, trans* sculptor Anton Prinner, and Surrealist painter Germain Vandersteen.

== Film stills (1942–1950) ==
During the war Savitry corresponded with filmmaker Paul Grimault (who was posted the Lower Rhine), and made stills from 1942 for Jacques Prévert and Marcel Carné. In 1947 he moves to Belle Île to be on the set of Carné's La Fleur de l'âge, making a famous image of Anouk Aimée holding a kitten. He also worked for the director Pierre Billon and Jean Grémillon.

=== Films ===
- 1931 Tabou dir. Friedrich Wilhelm Murnau
- 1942 Lumière d'été dir. Jean Grémillon
- 1946 Portes de la nuit dir. Marcel Carné
- 1947 La Fleur de l'âge dir. Marcel Carné
- 1949 Au revoir monsieur Grock dir. Pierre Billon

== Late painting ==
Savitry returned to painting in the 1960s with an exhibition at the Renée Laporte gallery in Antibes. He contributed the only painting unsold from his 1929 Zborowski show La lumiére du gaz arrivant dans les ruines to the exhibition 'Le Surréalisme: Sources, Histoire, Affinités' at Charpentier Gallery, Paris, in 1964.

He died in Paris on 30 October 1967.

== Exhibitions ==
- 1929 Paris, Galerie Zborowski
- 1948 French Photography, exhibition organised by the Photo League, New York
- 1963 Antibes, Galerie Laporte, 31 paintings
- 1964 Paris, Galerie Charpentier, Le Surréalisme : Sources, Histoire, Affinités.

=== Posthumous ===
- 1981 Paris, Centre Georges-Pompidou Paris 1937–Paris 1957, re-showing of the exhibition held at Photo League of New York in 1948
- 1989 Paris, at premises of Le Monde Les Années Montparnasse.
- 1990 Bibliothèque Historique de la Ville de Paris, 50 ans de photographies de presse, archives photographiques de Paris-Soir France-Soir et Paris-Match
- 2004 New York, Zabriskie Gallery
- 2007 Paris, Bibliothèque nationale de France La photographie humaniste
- 2008 Vendôme Museum
- 2011 L'Abbaye Sainte-Croix aux Sables d'Olonne Museum, 106 photographs, 20 Dec 2011 – 26 Feb 2012
- 2011 5 May to 6 Nov Émile Savitry, un photographe de Montparnasse, Valence, Musée de l'Illustration et de la Modernité de Valence ( MuVim )
- 2012 25 Oct to 27 Jan 2012 - 2013 Émile Savitry, un photographe de Montparnasse, Gentilly, Maison de la Photographie Robert-Doisneau
- April 2013 exhibition under the auspices of the Festival Photo de Mer de Vannes
- 2016 8 June to 5 October, Paris, Musée Mendjisky - Écoles de Paris, Émile Savitry. A photographer from Montparnasse
