= Clovis Trouille =

French surrealistic painter (1889–1975)

Camille Clovis Trouille (24 October 1889 – 24 September 1975) was a French artist known for paintings of erotic and anti-clerical subjects.

== Career ==
Trouille was born in La Fère, France, and was trained at the École des Beaux-Arts of Amiens from 1905 to 1910. His service in World War I gave him a lifelong hatred of the military, expressed in his first major painting Remembrance (1931). The painting depicts a pair of wraith-like soldiers clutching white rabbits, an airborne female contortionist throwing a handful of medals, and the whole scene being blessed by a cross-dressing cardinal.

This contempt for the Church as a corrupt institution provided Trouille with the inspiration for decades of work:

- Dialogue at the Carmel (1944) shows a skull wearing a crown of thorns being used as an ornament.
- The Mummy shows a mummified woman coming to life as a result of a shaft of light falling on a large bust of André Breton.
- The Magician (1944) has a self-portrait satisfying a group of swooning women with a wave of his magician's wand.
- My Tomb (1947) shows Trouille's tomb as a focal point of corruption and depravity in a graveyard.

Trouille's other common subjects were sex, as shown in Lust (1959), a portrait of the Marquis de Sade sitting in the foreground of a landscape decorated with a tableau of various perversions, and a "madly egoistic bravado" employed in a self-mocking style.

He worked primarily for himself and made his living as a restorer and decorator of department store mannequins.

Trouille died on 24 September 1975 in Neuilly-sur-Marne.

== Style ==
After his work was seen by Louis Aragon and Salvador Dalí, Trouille was declared a Surrealist by André Breton—a label Trouille accepted only as a way of gaining exposure, not having any real sympathy with that movement. Nonetheless, he maintained contact with the surrealists, including Breton and Marcel Jean.

The simple style and lurid colouring of Trouille's paintings echo the lithographic posters used in advertising in the first half of the 20th century. His 1946 reclining nude, shown from behind, is inscribed Oh! Calcutta! Calcutta!—a pun on the French pronunciation "quel cul t'as" ("what a rear you've got"), a photographic collage with oil paints from a reproduction of André Steiner's nude photograph in the July 1935 issue of the magazine Paris Sex-Appeal. The artwork's inscription became the namesake of the risqué theatrical revue Oh! Calcutta! which opened off-Broadway in 1969.

== Awards ==
In 2019 the National Leather Association International established an award named after Trouille for creators of surrealistic erotic art.
