= Josef Maria Eder =

Austrian chemist (1855–1944)

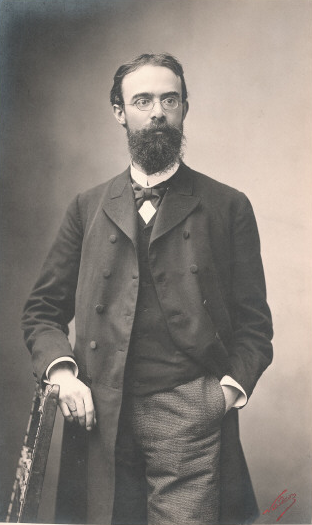
- Josef Maria Eder in 1887, aged 32, photographed by Nadar
- Born: 16 March 1855; Krems an der Donau, Austrian Empire
- Died: 18 October 1944 (aged 89); Kitzbühel, Nazi Germany
- Education: Vienna University of Technology
- Awards: Lieben Prize 1895
- Scientific career
- Fields: Chemistry of photography
- Workplaces: Vienna University of Technology

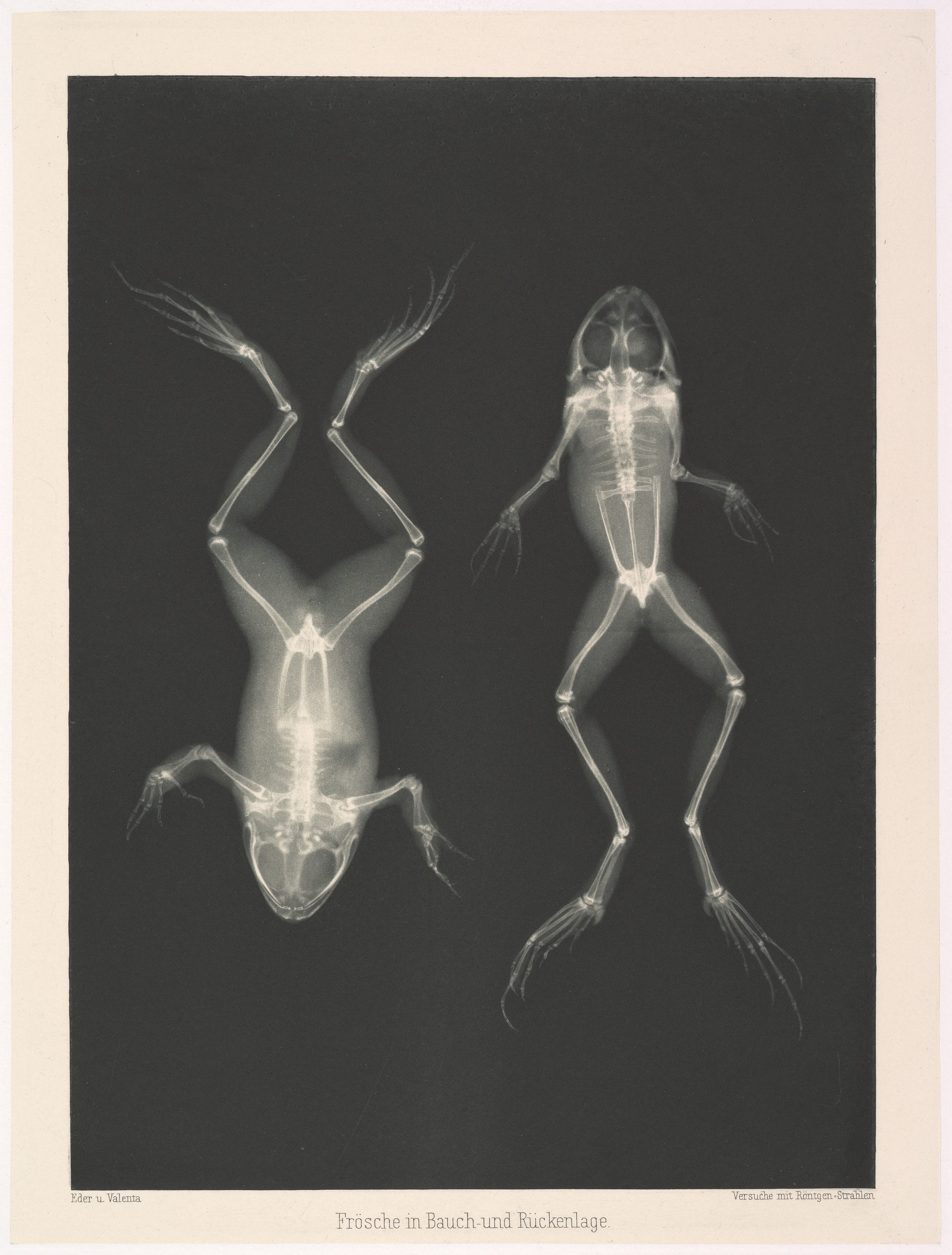
Early X-ray photo of frogs by Eder.

Josef Maria Eder (16 March 1855 – 18 October 1944) was an Austrian chemist who specialized in the chemistry of photography, and who wrote a comprehensive early history of the technical development of chemical photography.

== Life and work ==
Eder was born in Krems an der Donau in 1855. He studied chemistry, physics and mathematics at the Vienna University of Technology and at the University of Vienna. In 1876, he received his PhD and in 1879, after his habilitation, became lecturer at the Vienna University of Technology.

Eder's research then focused on the chemistry of photography. After spending some time at the Staatliche Gewerbeschule Vienna, he became lecturer at the Höhere Gewerbeschule Vienna. This change improved his capacity to undertake research. In the following years, Eder developed a sensitized gelatin silver process. Orthochromatic photographic plates, in combination with a color filter counter-acting the plates' inhomogeneous sensitivity to light of different wavelengths, yielded black and white images showing all colors of the light in their true brightness.

Eder was a professor at the Vienna University of Technology from 1892 to 1925 where one of the engineering students was the Hungarian André Steiner whom Eder encouraged to take up photography. Eder introduced scientific method into the development of photographic processes. In particular, he used spectroscopy and invented several new instruments including the "Eder-Hecht neutral wedge photometer" (with Walter Hecht (1896–1960)), also the "mercury oxalate photometer" which was a chemical photometer to measure the intensity of UV radiation. After the effect of X-rays on photographic material was published, Eder did research to improve the sensitivity of photographic material to X-rays.

For nearly three decades, Eder edited the annual Jahrbuch für Photographie und Reproduktionstechnik (Yearbook for Photography and Reproduction Processes) from 1887 to 1914, a compilation of developments in the photographic field, issued between 1887 and 1933. By 1884, Eder started writing his Geschichte der Photographie ('History of Photography') and Ausführliches Handbuch Der Photographie ('Extensive Handbook of Photography'), both still available in reprint. He was awarded the Lieben Prize in 1895 and became a member of the Austrian Academy of Sciences in 1930. On March 1, 1888 Eder founded the Institute for Photography and Reproduction Techniques (today the Höhere Graphische Bundes- Lehr- und Versuchsanstalt).

== Publications ==
Eder published over 650 publications. The History of Photography was published in four editions from 1881 to 1932, each of which was expanded.

- Eder, Josef Maria (1875). Ueber einige Methoden der Bestimmung der Salpetersäure [History of photochemistry and photography up to the present] (in German). Vienna: Friedrich Jasper. OCLC 559389305.
- Eder, Josef Maria (1878). Ueber die Reactionen der Chromsäure und der Chromate auf Gelatine, Gummi, Zucker und andere Substanzen [About the reactions of chromic acid and chromates on gelatine, gum, sugar and other substances] (in German). Vienna: Photogr. Correspondenz : Vogel. OCLC 883171974.
- Eder, Josef Maria (1879). Über die chemische Zusammensetzung des Pyroxylins und die Formel der Colintose [On the chemical composition of pyroxylin and the formula of colintose] (in German). OCLC 249106307.
- Eder, Josef Maria (1879). Ueber die chemischen Wirkungen des farbigen Lichtes und die Photographie in natürlichen Farben [On the chemical effects of coloured light and photography in natural colours] (in German). Vienna: Verl. d. Photograph. Correspondenz ; Vogel. OCLC 604162959.
- Eder, Josef Maria (1880). Der neue Eisenoxalat-Entwickler : und dessen Vergleichung mit dem Pyrogallus-Entwickler [The new iron oxalate developer: and its comparison with the Pyrogallol developer] (in German). Vienna: Verlag der Photographischen Correspondenz ; Hermann Vogel. OCLC 80152687.
- Eder, Josef Maria (1880). Ein neues chemisches Photometer mittelst Quecksilber - Oxalat zur Bestimmung der Intensität der ultravioletten [A new chemical photometer using mercury oxalate to determine the intensity of the ultraviolet] (in German). Vienna: unidentified.
- Eder, Josef Maria (1880). Beiträge zur Photochemie des Bromsilbers (Extract from Sitzungsberichte, K. Akademie der Wissenschaften, Vienna, Bd. LXXXI, 1880) [Contributions to the photochemistry of brominated silver] (in German). Vienna: K.k. Hof and state press. OCLC 41160468.
- Eder, Josef Maria; Pritchard, H. Baden; Wilmer, Horace (1881). Pritchard, E. B. (ed.). Modern Dry Plates ; or Emulsion Photography. Translated by Wilmer, Horace (English ed.). London: Piper & Carter. OCLC 752869586.
- Eder, J. M. (1893). Das Atelier und Laboratorium des Photographen. (Ausführliches Handbuch der Photographie.) Halle a.S: Verlag von Wilhelm Knapp.
- Eder, J. M., & Valenta, E. (1896). Spectralanalytische Untersuchung des Argons (Spectral Analysis of Argon'). Wien: Kaiserlich-Königlichen Hof- und Staatsdruckerei.
- Eder, J. M. (1913). Quellenschriften zu den frühesten Anfängen der Photographie bis zum XVIII. Jahrhundert. Halle an der Saale: Wilhelm Knapp.
- Eder, J. M., & Valenta, E. (1924). Atlas typischer Spektren.
- Eder, J. M. (1882-1932). Ausführliches Handbuch der Photographie. Halle: Wilheim Knapp.
  - (1912). Aktinometrie der photographischen Licht-Intensität künstlicher Lichtquellen
  - (1932). Geschichte der Photographie ('History of Photography'). Halle a. S: Knapp.

== Distinctions ==
- 1876: Voigtländer-Preis der Photographischen Gesellschaft gemeinsam mit Victor Tóth für „der Gesellschaft vorgelegte Arbeiten über Verstärkung der Negative und über Jodierung“ (Voigtländer Prize of the Photographic Society together with Victor Tóth for "works submitted to the society on the intensification of negatives and on iodisation")
- 1884: Progress Medal of the Photographic Society of Great Britain
- 1888: Ehrenpreis der Photographischen Gesellschaft für „seine unausgesetzten Forschungen und Publicationen auf dem Gebiete der Photographie und die in den Gesellschaftsversammlungen gehaltenen Vorträge“ (Honorary Prize of the Photographic Society for "his ongoing research and publications in the field of photography and his lectures given at social meetings")
- 1889: Elected as member of the German National Academy of Sciences, Leopoldina
- 1890: Honourable membership in the Camera Club, London
- 1895: Lieben Prize
- 1896: Honourable membership in der Société des Sciences photographiques, Paris
- 1897: Order of the Iron Crown, III. Klasse durch den Kaiser von Österreich
- 1907: Honourable membership der k.k. Gesellschaft der Ärzte in Wien (Austrian Medical Society)
- 1907, 12 June: Cross of the Order of Franz Joseph bestowed by the Emperor of Austria
- 1916: Mitgliedschaft der Kaiserlichen Akademie der Wissenschaften in der mathematisch-naturwissenschaftlichen Klasse, Wien (Membership of the Imperial Academy of Sciences in the class of mathematics and natural sciences, Vienna)
- Between 1916 und 1921: Nominated a total of ten times for the Nobel Prize in Chemistry
- 1923: Wilhelm Exner Medal
- 1924: Ehrenpräsident der Photographischen Gesellschaft (Honorary President of the Photographic Society)
- 1942: Goethe-Medaille für Kunst und Wissenschaft

== See also ==
- Improvements to Julius Scheiner's system of measuring film speeds in Scheinergrade.
