= Science Source =

New York stock photo agency

- Science Source logo
- Industry: stock photography, stock footage
- Founded: 1957
- Founder: Peter Schults
- Headquarters: 405 Lexington Avenue; Floor 9 Office #730; New York City, NY 10174; United States
- Owner: Bug Sutton, Robert Zentmaier
- Website: www.sciencesource.com

Science Source (formerly Photo Researchers) is a stock photo agency based in Manhattan, New York City. It represented 2,000 photographers in 1993.

== History ==
Founded in 1957 by Peter Schults, Photo Researchers Inc, DBA Science Source, is a stock content provider and artists' agent. The company was purchased in 1996 by Bug Sutton, Creative Director and founder of the Science Source division, and Robert Zentmaier, President and CFO.

Science Source supports over 1.1 million photographs, illustrations, photomicrographs, video clips and animations on its searchable database. It represents hundreds of photographers, illustrators, and videographers and also produces its own, in-house photos, videos, 2D, and 3D illustrations. Its content is used by technical and textbook publishers, newspapers and magazines, as well as broadcast and internet media. They are a resource for commercial art buyers, hospitals and HMOs, scientists, pharmaceutical companies, physicians, educators, and students. They also provide material to universities (e.g. MIT, Harvard University and Johns Hopkins) and museums (e.g. the American Museum of Natural History, The Metropolitan Museum of Art, and the Field Museum of Natural History). Over 1600 of their images are available as on-demand, one-off personal prints and other consumer products through Fine Art America (FAA) and through Media Storehouse.
