= Izis Bidermanas =

Lithuanian-Jewish photographer (1911–1980)

Israëlis Bidermanas (17 January 1911 – 16 May 1980 ), who worked under the name of Izis, was a Lithuanian-Jewish photographer who worked in France and is best known for his photographs of French circuses and of Paris.

== Biography ==
Born in Marijampolė, present-day Lithuania, Bidermanas arrived in France in 1930 to become a painter. In 1933, he directed a photographic studio in the 13th Arrondissement of Paris. During World War II, being a Jew, he had to leave occupied Paris. He went to Ambazac, in the Limousin, where he adopted the pseudonym Izis and where he was arrested and tortured by the Nazis. He was freed by the French Resistance and became an underground fighter. At that time he photographed his companions, including Colonel Georges Guingouin. The poet and underground fighter Robert Giraud was the first to write about Izis in the weekly magazine Unir, a magazine created by the Resistance. He died in Paris.

== Humanist photography ==
Upon the liberation of France at the end of World War II, Izis had a series of portraits of maquisards (rural resistance fighters who operated mainly in southern France) published to considerable acclaim. He returned to Paris where he became friends with French poet Jacques Prévert and other artists. Izis became a major figure in the mid-century French movement of humanist photography — also exemplified by Brassaï, Cartier-Bresson, Doisneau, Sabine Weiss and Ronis — with "work that often displayed a wistfully poetic image of the city and its people."

For his first book, Paris des rêves (Paris of Dreams), Izis asked writers and poets to contribute short texts to accompany his photographs, many of which showed Parisians and others apparently asleep or daydreaming. The book, which Izis designed, was a success. Izis joined Paris Match in 1950 and remained with it for twenty years, during which time he could choose his assignments.

== Recognition and legacy ==
Meanwhile, his books continued to be popular with the public. Among the numerous books by Izis, Gerry Badger and Martin Parr have especial praise for Le Cirque d'Izis (The Circus of Izis), "published in 1965, but bearing the stamp of an earlier era". Shot mostly in Paris but also in Lyon, Marseille and Toulon, the photographs are "affectionate and nostalgic, but also deeply melancholic" with "a desolate undercurrent", forming a work that is "profound, moving and extraordinary".

== Collections of photographs and shows ==
- Paris des rêves. Lausanne: Éditions Clairfontaine; Paris: Éditions Mermoud, 1950.
- Grand Bal du printemps. Lausanne: Éditions Clairfontaine, 1951. With text by Jacques Prévert. Paris: Cherche midi, 2008. ISBN 978-2-7491-1134-6.
- Charmes de Londres. Lausanne: Éditions Clairfontaine, 1952. Editions de Monza, 1999. With text by Jacques Prévert.
- Gala Day London. Harvill Press, 1953. With text by twenty-two writers and poets, including John Betjeman.
- The Queen's People. [London]: Harvill Press, [1953]. With text by John Pudney.
- Paradis terrestre. Lausanne: Éditions Clairfontaine, 1953. With text by Colette.
- Izis. Chicago: Art Institute of Chicago, 1955.
- included in The Family of Man, MoMA's international travelling exhibition and publications, 1955-1962.
- Israël. Lausanne: Éditions Clairfontaine, 1955.
- Israel. New York: Orion Press, 1958.
- Le Cirque d'Izis. Monte Carlo: André Sauret, 1965. With text by Jacques Prévert and original artwork by Marc Chagall.
- The World of Marc Chagall. London: Aldus, 1968. ISBN 0-490-00100-9. Garden City, N.Y.: Doubleday, 1968.
- Le Monde de Chagall. Paris: Gallimard, 1969.
- Izis (Israel Biderman), octobre-decembre 1972. Tel Aviv: Musée de Tel-Aviv, 1972.
- Paris des poètes. Paris: F. Nathan, 1977.
- Izis. Toulouse: Galerie municipale du Château d'eau, 1978. OCLC 799087502.
- Rétrospective Izis: 14 octobre-8 janvier, Hôtel de Sully. Paris: Caisse nationale des monuments historiques et des sites, 1988. ISBN 2-85822-079-4.
- Izis, photographies. Paris: Editions du Désastre, 1988. ISBN 2-87770-000-3.
- Les Amoureux du temps retrouvé. Treville, 1989.
- Les Enfants du temps perdu Treville, 1989.
- Izis: photos 1944-1980. Paris: Editions de la Martinière, 1993. ISBN 2-7324-2016-6.
- Izis, Captive Dreams: Photographs 1944–1980. London: Thames & Hudson, 1993. ISBN 0-500-54185-X.
- IZIS, Paris des rèves Paris City Hall, Jan-May 2010. Catalogue published by Flammarion 2010, and online exhibit with HD images on Paris.fr.
