= Nora Dumas =

Hungarian photographer

Nora Dumas (1890, Budapest – 23 May 1979, Genthod, Switzerland) was a Hungarian photographer who worked mainly in Paris in the Humanist genre.

== Biography ==
Nora Dumas was born Kelenföldi Telkes Nóra, in 1890, in Budapest, and she left for Paris, France, in 1913. Spending the years 1914–1917 in an internment camp, she then went to the United States, where she met the Swiss architect, Adrien-Émile Dumas, whom she married.

Returning to France, the couple settled in Moisson. Nora’s photographs produced there and amongst other villages of the Seine depict rural life as endangered, as a result of the wartime decimation of the male population and poverty. Ergy Landau took her on as an assistant in her studio in Paris in 1929, where they worked together for nearly ten years, sharing the celebrated Ukrainian model, Assia Granatouroff for studio photographs of the nude. Both also produced portraits of adults and children and fashion photographs. Her photo of a draught horse straining at the yoke brought her attention and inclusion in an exhibition, with Ergy Landau and André Kertész, Das Lichtbild in Munich in 1931, and other exhibitions in Paris and Brussels. In 1937 Beaumont and Nancy Newhall visited Paris on their honeymoon which they combined with visits to collectors of photography and photographers for the exhibition Photography 1839-1937 that Beaumont, then a Museum of Modern Art librarian, had been commissioned to curate for the institution. He purchased works by Dumas, Brassai and others during this visit.

Dumas joined the agency Rapho which was set up by Charles Rado to represent fellow Hungarian friends and refugee photographers including Brassaï, Ergy Landau and Ylla, and her work was taken up by a number of magazines including Vu, Bifur, Photographie, Paris magazine (a celebrity gossip magazine) and Follies (a popular French pin-up magazine), and in 1940 in the USA it appeared in Life. In 1955 Edward Steichen included her low-angle, frame-filling photograph of a jovial French farmer (credited to her and the Rapho Agency) in MoMA's world-touring The Family of Man which was seen by 9 million people.

Nora Dumas died on 23 May 1979 at her home the Pension du Sautoir d'Or in Genthod, Switzerland. She was cremated at the Crematorium of Saint-Georges in Petit-Lancy (a suburb of Geneva) and buried in the cemetery at Nernier on the French side of Lake Geneva alongside her husband.

Her works are archived by the Rapho Agency.

== Exhibitions ==
- 1931 - Pléiade Gallery, with Ilse Bing and Maurice Tabard
- 1931 - Plume d’Or Gallery
- 1931 - Munich, Das Lichtbild International Exhibition (together with Florence Henri, Germaine Krull, Ergy Landau, Kollar, André Kertész)
- 1933 - Studio Saint-Jaques Galerie, exhibition entitled Exposition pour la Constitution des Artistes Photographes
- 1933 - Hungarian House of Paris, Photographes hongrois
- 1933 - Brussels Deuxiéme Internationale de la Photographie et du Cinéma 1937 (with Kollar, Brassai, Kertész, Landau, Boucher, Zuber)
- 1937 - Galerie d’Art et Industrie, group exhibition
- 1938 - Galerie Paul Magné, Revue de la Photographie 1938
- 1939 - Brussels, Palais des Beaux-Art, exhibition Le Visages de la France
- 1955 - The Family of Man, a MoMA international, touring, exhibition.
- 1957 - Budapest, Madome
- 1989 - Musée Nicéphore Niépce, Chalon-sur-Saône exhibition of her collected works
