= Ylla =

Hungarian photographer

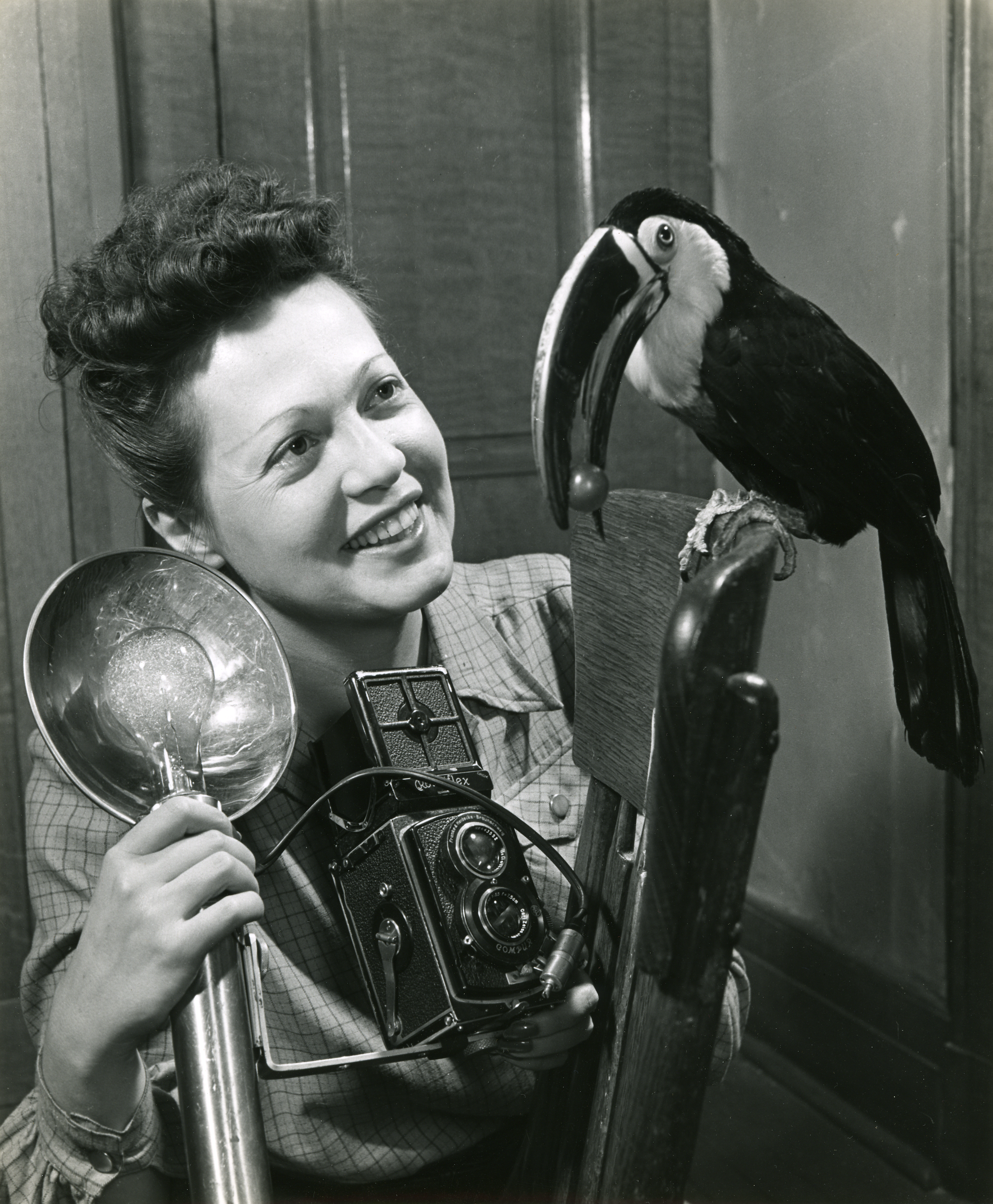
- Ylla with toucan, photo by Eric Schaal c.1943
- Born: Camilla Koffler; August 16, 1911; Vienna, Austria-Hungary
- Died: March 30, 1955 (aged 43); Bharatpur, India
- Education: Belgrade Academy of Fine Arts, Académie Colarossi
- Known for: Photography of animals
- Movement: Nature, animals

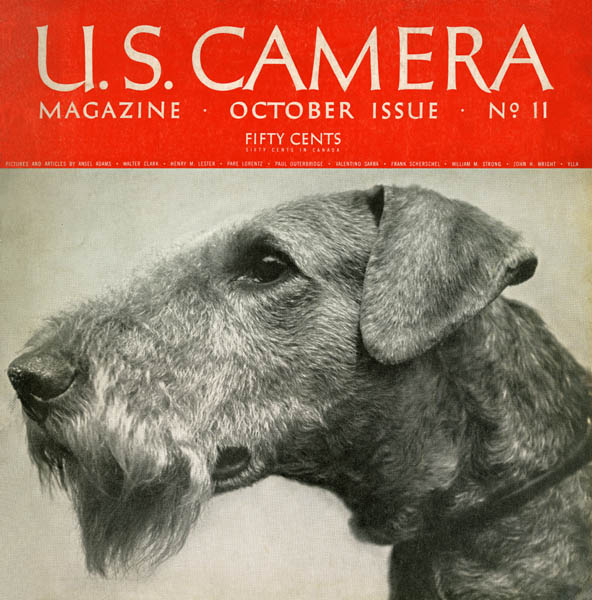
U.S. Camera, October 1940

Camilla "Ylla" Koffler (Hungarian: Koffler Kamilla; 16 August 1911 – 30 March 1955) was a Hungarian photographer who specialized in animal photography. At the time of her death she "was generally considered the most proficient animal photographer in the world."

== Biography ==
Koffler was born in Vienna, Austria, to a Romanian father and Croatian mother, both Hungarian nationals. At age eight, she was placed in a German boarding school in Budapest, Hungary. In 1926, the teenage Koffler joined her mother in Belgrade, Yugoslavia, where she studied sculpture with Italian Yugoslav sculptor Petar Pallavicini at the Academy of Fine Arts; finding that her given name Camilla was the same as the Serbian for "camel" (камила, kamila), she changed it to "Ylla" (pronounced ee-la).

In 1929, Ylla received a commission for a bas-relief sculpture for a Belgrade movie theater. By 1931, she had moved to Paris, France, where she studied sculpture at the Académie Colarossi and worked as photo retoucher and assistant to photographer Ergy Landau.

In 1932, Ylla began photographing animals, exhibited her work at Galerie de La Pléiade, and opened a studio to photograph pets. In 1933, she was introduced to Charles Rado and became a founding member of the RAPHO press agency.

In 1940, New York's Museum of Modern Art submitted her name to the U.S. Department of State requesting an entry visa; she immigrated to the United States in 1941. She opened a studio in New York where she continued to photograph animals.

In 1952, Ylla traveled to Africa, and in 1954 she visited India for the first time.

In 1953, en route with her mother to Cape Cod by plane, the plane ran out of fuel and crashed. Ylla, trapped under water, struggled to free herself and fainted upon reaching the surface. She was rescued by a fisherman, her mother drowned. Proceeds from wrongful death insurance helped pay for Ylla's journey through India the following year.

In 1955, Ylla was fatally injured after falling from a jeep while photographing a bullock cart race during festivities in Bharatpur, North India. The last photographs she ever took were published in the November 14, 1955 issue of Sports Illustrated. Ylla’s obituaries appeared in eight countries, with twenty-four published in total.

== Quotes and posthumous tributes ==
Julian Huxley:

. . . She is, I think, the outstanding animal photographer. She is outstanding in being able to seize in her pictures some essential quality of her subjects, which more orthodox photographers are apt to miss in their desire for so-called realistic and complete representation.

Charles Rado:

[Ylla was] one of the most skilled and dedicated photographers of animals. They were her life, she loved them all. . . . She was wonderfully alive, amusing, fond of travel and people, and she loved her work because she loved and understood animals. Her books, in particular, gave her much satisfaction. She worked on them with infinite patience, supervising their design and printing. Animals (1951) won a prize as one of the most beautiful books of the year. . . . She contributed to practically every illustrated magazine here and in Europe. . . . The thrill of observing and photographing wild animals in their natural habitat was a new and exciting experience to Ylla; she would never again be content with photographing zoo animals.

Harry Phillips, Publisher of Sports Illustrated:

[Ylla’s accidental death] ended an outstanding career in its prime and brought a sense of almost personal loss to the millions all over the world who had come to know her through her beautiful, beguiling and painstaking studies of animals in a dozen books and a score of magazines.

== Movie Hatari! Character Based on Ylla ==
Her life work of photographing animals inspired film director and producer Howard Hawks so much that he had his script writer, Leigh Brackett, change the script to create one of the main characters based on Ylla for his 1962 movie, Hatari!, starring John Wayne. Hawks said, "We took that part of the story from a real character, a German girl. She was the best animal photographer in the world." The movie character Anna Maria "Dallas" D’Alessandro is a photographer working for a zoo; she was played by actress Elsa Martinelli.

== Selected bibliography ==
- 1937 Chiens par Ylla/Ylla's Dog Fancies, Jules Supervielle (Paris: Editions OET/London: Methuen Publishers)
- 1937 Chats par Ylla, Paul Léautaud (Paris: Editions OET)
- 1938 Animal Language, Julian Huxley (includes recordings of animal calls) (London: Country Life Press; New York: Grosset & Dunlop; 2nd ed. 1964)
- 1944 They All Saw It, Margaret Wise Brown (New York: Harper & Brothers)
- 1947 The Sleepy Little Lion, Margaret Wise Brown (New York: Harper & Brothers)
- 1947 Le Petit Lion, Jacques Prévert (Paris: Arts et Métiers Graphiques)
- 1950 Tico-Tico, Niccolo Tucci (New York: Harper & Brothers); 1952: Georges Ribemont-Dessaignes (Paris: Libraire Gallimard)
- 1950 O Said the Squirrel, Margaret Wise Brown (London: Harvill Press)
- 1950 Des Bêtes..., Jacques Prévert (Lausanne: Edition Jean Marguerat; Paris: Libraire Gallimard)
- 1950 Animals, Julian Huxley (New York: Hastings House; London: Harvill Press)
- 1952 The Duck, Margaret Wise Brown (New York: Harper & Brothers; London: Harvill Press)
- 1953 Animals in Africa, L.S.B. Leakey (New York: Harper & Brothers; London: Harvill Press; Paris: Robert Delpire/Revue Neuf; Hamburg: Christian Wegner)
- 1956 Twee kleine beertjes = Deux petits ours, Paulette Falconnet (Brussel; Amsterdam : Elsevier)
- 1958 Animals in India (Lausanne: La Guilde du Livre/Clairefontaine; New York: Harper & Brothers)
