= Lucien Hervé =

Hungarian photographer (1910–2007)

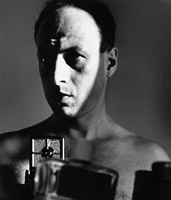
- Self-portrait (1938)
- Born: August 7, 1910; Hódmezővásárhely, Hungary
- Died: June 26, 2007 (aged 96); Paris, France
- Occupation: Photographer

Lucien Hervé (born László Elkán: 7 August 1910, – 26 June 2007) was a Hungarian photographer. He was notable for his architectural photography, beginning with his work for Le Corbusier.

== Biography ==
- 1910 : Born as László Elkán on 7 August in Hódmezővásárhely, Hungary, son of Nelly Ritscher and Lajos Elkán (a leather merchant and town councillor).
- 1918 : The Elkán family moves to Budapest
- 1920 : 3 March, his father dies. Beginning of his piano studies.
- 1923 : In addition to his studies of music, sport plays an increasing role in his life. He goes in for Greco-Roman wrestling and swimming. He befriends working-class youths and turns away from the bourgeois lifestyle of his mother.
- 1928 : Goes to Vienna, where he enrolls in the university to study economics. At the same time, he takes drawing courses at the Academy of Fine Arts and visits museums.
- 1929 : In the summer, joins his brother in Paris and spends his time visiting museums. At the end of the year, returns to Budapest.
- 1930 : In February, returns to Paris, where he lives with Lucienne Savin. Becomes a bank clerk. Abuses at the bank lead to his resignation in 1931. Having been placed on the "black list", he cannot find a job. He becomes active in the French-Hungarian trade union movement, studies economics and attends the workers' university.
- 1932 : Works as designers' representative and then as a fashion designer for couture firms such as: Patou, Rochas, Lelong, Paquin, Worth, Schiaparelli, Molineaux, Lanvin, Chanel.
- 1934 : Member of the French volleyball team that beats Germany in official competition. Joins the French Communist Party. Lives with Fernande Lacroix (a sales clerk with Patou).
- 1935 : Organises strikes in the fashion industry and is consequently dismissed by the fashion design company Patou. Becomes a union representative in the Confédération générale du travail (CGT), France's national organized-labor group, then secretary-general of the Central Labour Organization in the eighth arrondissement of Paris. Lives with Mado Ferrand (a head seamstress). Works illegally under the name of Elec.
- 1938 : Receives French citizenship. In March, he is expelled from the French Communist Party. In July, begins working with the Hungarian photographer Miklós Müller, and he produces photo reportages for Marianne Magazine, a literary publication. In September, when the Munich Agreement is signed, Müller leaves France.
- 1939 : After Müller's departure, Elkán becomes a photojournalist for Marianne Magazine; for convenience, he uses Müller's byline. His reports deal mainly with social issues, but he also returns to fashion: at the Maggy Rouff fashion house, he makes a report with the actress Alice Cocea, entitled History of a Dress. He is drafted into the army, in the Fifth Infantry Régiment, and becomes an army photographer under the command of Colonel Jean de Lattre de Tassigny. Marries Mado Ferrand.
- 1940 : 4 June, captured by the German forces in the Battle of Dunkirk. Prisoner of war in Hohenstein, East Prussia. Begins to paint during his captivity. Serves as spokesman for the French Resistance in the prison camp. He and some of his fellows found an underground communist party.
- 1941 : 2 February, arrested by the Gestapo for Resistance activities in the camp. Escapes in September. He reaches Vichy France, works for Union Electric on the construction of a hydroelectric station in Fond de France. Joins the underground army of the French Résistance in Grenoble, is in charge of resupplying camps in the mountains. He joins the Maquis du Vercors, the groups of resistants. Takes the Résistance name of Lucien Hervé. He paints and takes part in the exhibitions of the Salon d'Automne in Paris.
- 1943 : Reinstated into the underground French Communist Party. In December, called to Paris to direct the secret activity of the Mouvement national des prisonniers de guerre et des déportés (MNPGD), an organization to help the prisoners of war and the deported people. He produces and distributes leaflets, and goes into hiding.
- 1945 : Works in the direction of the MNPGD, along with François Mitterrand. Assistant of the president of the French Red Cross and then general-secretary of the French Aid Organisation for Soviet POWs and Deportees. Meets the Chinese government leader Deng Xiaoping, whose portrait he draws at the Founding Congress of the World Fédération of Trade Unions. Divorces Mado Ferrand. He resumes painting.
- 1946 : In February, sent by Georges Bidault, président of France's provisional government, on a consular mission to Budapest. Stays for three months.
- 1947 : In January he is expelled for a second time from the French Communist Party. Works occasionally as an interior decorator and a designer of theatre scenery and film posters. He continues to paint and exhibit, and resumes his writing and photography work for magazines such as France Illustration, Point de vue, Regards, Lilliput. He compiles reports on artistic and cultural themes. He meets Judith Molnár, who later becomes his wife.
- 1949 : Meets the Dominican Father Marie-Alain Couturier, the editor-in-chief of the ecclesiastical art magazine L'Art Sacré, who introduces him to Henri Matisse. In December, on the advice of Father Couturier, he goes to Marseille to photograph the Unité d'Habitation of Le Corbusier. He sends Le Corbusier the 650 prints taken in one day. The architect asks him to become his photographer.
- 1950 : Starts photographing intensively for Le Corbusier. 3 November, he marries Judith Molnar.
- 1950-1955 : Photographs regularly for Le Corbusier and, at the same time, for many other international architects (Alvar Aalto, Marcel Breuer, Kenzo Tange, Richard Neutra, Oscar Niemeyer, Aulis Blomstedt), as well as numerous French architects (Bernard Zehrfuss, Jean Balladur, Georges Candilis, Georges-Henri Pingusson, Michel Écochard, etc.) and architect-engineers such as Jean Prouvé.
- 1955 : Accompanies Le Corbusier to Chandigarh and Ahmedabad in India. He photographs the government buildings under construction as well as local historical architecture. He travels to Fatehpur Sikri, Delhi and Jaipur. Commissioned to photograph the construction of the Paris offices of UNESCO, designed by the architects Marcel Breuer, Pier Luigi Nervi and Bernard Zehrfuss. He follows the construction work for three years until its completion.
- 1957 : 2 May, the birth of his son, Daniel Rodolf Hervé.
- 1959 : Commissioned by the Spanish publishing house RM Editorial, he photographs the Escorial and Méditerranéen vernacular architecture in Spain. The books remained unpublished.
- 1961 : Second trip to Chandigarh. Takes advantage of contracts with the French Electrical and Metallurgy Fédérations, the magazine Architecture d'aujourd'hui, and the publishing house Éditions Gallimard to travel around the world (visiting Japan, Cambodia, Sri Lanka, Turkey, Greece, Crete, California, Mexico, Peru, and Brazil).
- 1962 : Engaged by the director of the French Middle Eastern Archaeological Institute to photograph archeological sites in Syria, Lebanon, and Iran.
- 1963 : Joins the editorial board of Carré Bleu, an architectural journal founded in 1958. Launches the traveling exhibition Langage de l'architecture.
- 1965 : First signs of multiple sclerosis appear. 27 August, Le Corbusier dies.
- 1966-1970 : His illness limits his movements, he concentrates on organising exhibitions and the publication of his books. Makes collages, often using his own photographs. Progressively returns to photography, continuing his researches on abstraction begun in the late 1940s. He writes for architectural journals and studies urban planning issues.
- 1970 : Travels to Belgium to work with the architect Pierre Puttemans on the photographs for a book on modern architecture in Belgium, often accompanied and assisted by his son. Starting in the 1970s, serves on many graduate-exam juries for architecture schools (École Nationale des Beaux-Arts, École Camondo, Paris).
- 1974-1984 : A difficult period of his illness. Thanks to his traveling exhibitions, he has a constant presence in artistic life.
- 1997-1998 : Travels to Austria to work with the architect Attila Batár on the photographs for a book on the urban planning of the Mölkersteig district in Vienna.
- 13 October 2000, his son, the photographer and video artist Daniel Rodolf Hervé, died.

== Legacy and honors ==
- 1985 : Under the auspices of the Rencontres d'Arles, he receives the Medal of the City of Arles, as one of the first donors of his photographs to the Musée Réattu. He also is awarded by the honorary citizenship of Arles.
- 1990 : Receives the medal of the French Legion of Honour for his activity in the French Resistance.
- 1993 : Receives the Fine Arts Medal from the Académie of Architecture, Paris.
- 1994 : Named Chevalier des Arts et des Lettres.
- 2000 : Receives Grand Prize in Photography from the city of Paris. Hungary awards him the Order of Merit of the Republic.
- 2001 : In Hungary, he is elected as a member of the Széchenyi Academy of Literature and Arts. He receives an oeuvre award from the Association of Hungarian Photographers. He is awarded with the officer degree of the French Ordre des Arts et des Lettres.
- 2004 : He establishes a photographic award – Prix Lucien Hervé et Rodolf Hervé, to support young professional photographers.

== Solo exhibitions ==
- 1985 Perception de l'architecture The Rencontres d'Arles festival
- 1999 Architecte de l'ombre / Le Beau court la rue" The Rencontres d'Arles festival
- 2004 Fotografie di architettura – Le Corbusier, Biennale Internazionale di Fotografia di Brescia, Italy
- 2005 Lucien Hervé, L'œil de l'architecte, CIVA, Brussels
- 2007 Construction - Composition / Le Corbusier – Lucien Hervé Fondation Le Corbusier, Paris (this exhibition was on show in India as well)
- 2007 Le Corbusier – Lucien Hervé, Galerie Taisei, Tokyo
- 2007 Rétrospective Lucien Hervé, Galerie Caméra Obscura, Paris
- 2007 In memoriam Lucien Hervé, Galerie du Jour agnès b., Paris
- 2008 Lucien Hervé, Photographies, Chapelle Bacchus, Besançon
- 2008 Le Corbusier e Lucien Hervé Construção/Composição, Lisbon
- 2008 Párizsi fotográfiák és művészportrék, Magyar Fotográfusok Háza – Mai Manó Ház, Budapest
- 2008 Lucien Hervé – The Soul of an Architect, Michael Hoppen Photography, London
- 2009 Architettura in immagini. Lucien Hervé fotografa Le Corbusier, Palazzo Te, Mantua
- 2010 Lucien Hervé, Galerie du Jour agnès b., Paris
- 2010 Lucien Hervé, sculpteur d'images, Keitelman Galerie, Brussels
- 2010 Lucien Hervé 100, Szépművészeti Múzeum (Museum of Fine Arts), Budapest
- 2010 Elkán László hazatér. Lucien Hervé 100, Emlékpont Múzeum, Hódmezővásárhely (Hungary)
- 2011 Vivants, Maison de la Photographie Robert Doisneau, Gentilly
- 2012 « Contacts » – Lucien Hervé, Galerie Camera Obscura, Paris

== Documentary films ==
- Tamás Margit : « Lucien Hervé », documentaire, 21' – 1992
- Szilvia Seres : « Lucien Hervé », documentaire, 50' – 2005
- Anne Ikhlef, Concerto en noir et blanc documentary, 50' - 2007
- Illés Sarkantyu, Lucien Hervé, documentary, 26' - 2010
- Gerrit Messiaen, Lucien Hervé photographer despite himself on YouTube, documentary, 52' - 2013
- Jérôme Bertrand, Chandigarh vu par Lucien Hervé, documentaire, 22' – 2013 (Kinokast, Vimeo)

== Collections and archives ==
Photographs of the UNESCO Headquarters taken between 1955-1958 were donated to UNESCO by Judith Hervé in 2008, on the occasion of the 50th anniversary of the construction of the Organization's Headquarters, according to Hervé's wishes.

The Getty Research Institute holds a collection of over 18,000 of Hervé’s photographic negatives and his photographs are held by other major museums, for example, the Tate and MoMA.

The Conway Library at the Courtauld Institute of Art is in the process of digitising its archive of primarily architectural photographs, including images taken by Hervé of Le Corbusier's Unité d’Habitation.
