= Ken Heyman =

American photographer (1930–2019)

- Born: 6 October 1930; Manhattan, New York City, New York, USA
- Died: 10 December 2019 (aged 89); New York City, New York
- Known for: Photography
- Spouse(s): Wendy Drew (divorced); Brenda Richmond (divorced); Judith Raboy (1998-2019)
- Website: kenheyman.com

Ken Heyman (October 6, 1930 – December 10, 2019) was an American photographer, best known for his collaborations with the cultural anthropologist Margaret Mead and the 36th President of the United States Lyndon B. Johnson.

== Biography ==
Heyman studied under Margaret Mead at Columbia University and subsequently traveled with her to the Indonesian island of Bali where they collaborated on the book Family (1965). The volume went on to sell over 300,000 copies. Mead once said of his work done in concert with her own that "Ken photographs relationships".

In 1964, Heyman collaborated with writer John Rublowsky for the book Pop Art (Basic Books, 1965). Andy Warhol, Roy Lichtenstein, Claes Oldenburg, James Rosenquist, and Tom Wesselmann were among the artists Heyman photographed over the course of three days.

Then in 1966, Heyman provided the photographs for the volume This America with text by President Lyndon B. Johnson extolling the latter's Great Society plan.

In 1968, Heyman provided the photographs for "The Color of Man" (Text by Robert Carl Cohen).

In 1975, Heyman collaborated on a second book with Mead, World Enough.

Heyman also took the photographs for the book The Private World of Leonard Bernstein, which peers into the inner sanctum of the composer, conductor, and musician Leonard Bernstein and includes a picture the lensman captured of Charlie Chaplin singing an aria from Giuseppe Verdi's La traviata with Bernstein playing the piano.

Heyman's work is included in the permanent collection of among other art institutions the Museum of Modern Art, Metropolitan Museum of Art, and Whitney Museum all in New York City, and the Nasher Museum of Art at Duke University in Durham, North Carolina.

For a time, Heyman was a member of the Magnum photographic cooperative. Also during his career, he was represented by the Rapho photo agency.

In 2007, Heyman's photo portraits of renowned pop artists were the subject of the Pop Portraits exhibition at the Albright -Knox Gallery (now known as the Buffalo AKG Art Museum). One of Heyman's portraits of Lichtenstein from this series was also exhibited on the show Artist Complex – Photographic Portraits from Baselitz to Warhol at in 2918 at the Museum für Fotografie in Berlin.
