= Jacques Henri Lartigue =

French photographer (1894–1986)

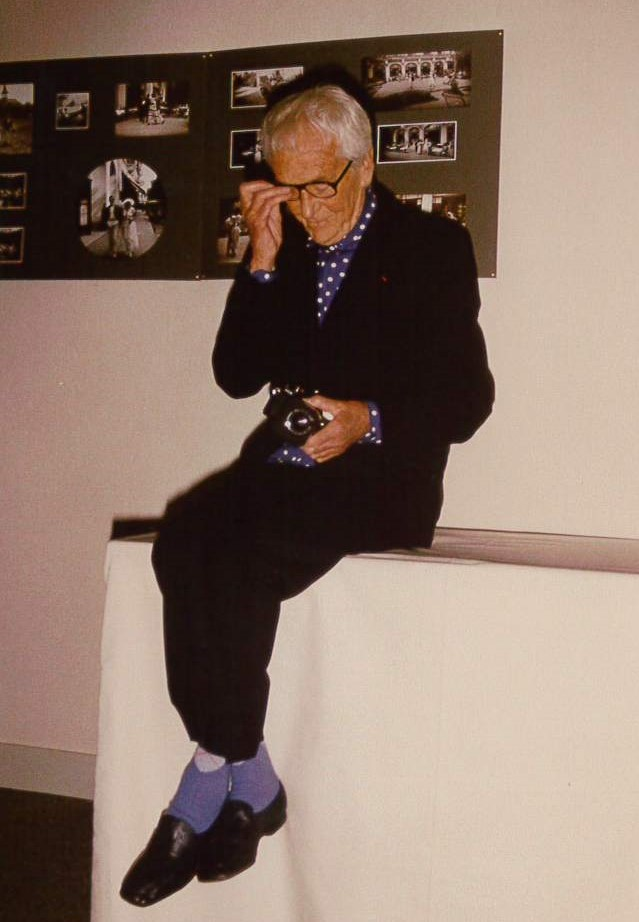
- Jacques Henri Lartigue in 1986
- Born: 13 June 1894; Courbevoie, Paris, France
- Died: 12 September 1986 (aged 92); Nice, France
- Occupations: Photographer, painter

Jacques Henri Lartigue (French: [laʁtig]; 13 June 1894 – 12 September 1986) was a French photographer and painter, known for his photographs of automobile races, planes and female Parisian fashion models.

== Biography ==
Born in Courbevoie in western Paris to a wealthy family, Lartigue started taking photographs when he was seven. He photographed his friends and family at play – running and jumping; racing home-built race cars; making kites, gliders as well as aeroplanes; and climbing the Eiffel Tower. He was one of the first artists to use the Kodak Brownie camera for snapshots. He also photographed sport events, such as the Coupe Gordon Bennett and the French Grand Prix, early flights of aviation pioneers such as Gabriel Voisin, Louis Blériot, Hubert Latham, Louis Paulhan and Roland Garros. He also captured in his camera, tennis players such as Suzanne Lenglen at the French Open tennis championships. Many of his initial, famous photographs were originally captured in stereo, for example seen in Hidden Depths but he also produced a vast number of images in all formats and media including glass plates in various sizes, autochromes, and film. He developed his own photographs from a young age.

While he sold a few photographs to sporting magazines such as La Vie au Grand Air, in middle age he concentrated on painting which also was his source of income and living. However, he continued taking photographs and maintained written journals about them throughout his life. At the age of 69 his boyhood photographs were 'discovered' by Charles Rado of the Rapho agency who introduced Lartigue to John Szarkowski, curator of the Museum of Modern Art, who arranged an exhibition of his work at the museum. Life magazine published the photos in 1963.

This exhibition gained him fame and exposure to the industry. He then got opportunities to work with several fashion magazines and became famous in other countries as well. In 1974, he was commissioned by the newly elected President of France Valéry Giscard d'Estaing to shoot his official portrait. The result was a simple photo, simply lit, using the national flag as a background. He was rewarded with his first French retrospective at the Musée des Arts Décoratifs the following year, which paved the way for more commissions from fashion and decoration magazines.

Although best known as a photographer, Lartigue was also a good painter. He often showed up in the official salons in Paris and in the south of France from 1922. His work was part of the painting event in the art competition at the 1924 Summer Olympics. He was friends with a wide selection of literary and artistic celebrities including the playwright Sacha Guitry, the singer Yvonne Printemps, the painters Kees van Dongen, Pablo Picasso and the artist-playwright-filmmaker Jean Cocteau. He also worked on the sets of the film-makers Jacques Feyder, Abel Gance, Robert Bresson, François Truffaut and Federico Fellini, and many of these celebrities became the subject of his photographs. Lartigue, however, photographed everyone he came in contact with. His most frequent muses were his three wives, and his mistress of the early 1930s, the Romanian model Renée Perle.

His first book, Diary of a Century was published in collaboration with Richard Avedon. The book was mentioned at the Rencontres d'Arles Book Award in 1971. The next year he was elected as the festival's guest of honor. He continued taking photographs throughout the last three decades of his life, finally achieving commercial success. An evening screening was presented by Michel Tournier: "Jacques-Henri Lartigue & Jeanloup Sieff."

In 1974, his work was included in the group exhibition "Filleuls et parrains." In 1984, the movie "Lartigue, année 90," by François Reichenbach was released. At the same time his work "Les 6 x 13 de Jacques-Henri Lartigue" based on his stereo and panoramic photographs was exhibited in the festival. One of the evening's screenings was "J.-H. Lartigue, l'amateur de rêve" by Patrick Roegiers, in 1994, and a last exhibition was presented: "Lartigue a cent ans."

== Collections ==
Lartigue's work is held in the permanent collections of many institutions worldwide, including the Harvard Art Museums, the Los Angeles County Museum of Art, the George Eastman Museum, the Detroit Institute of Arts, the University of Michigan Museum of Art, the San Francisco Museum of Modern Art, the Princeton University Art Museum, the Museum of Modern Art, and the Museum of Contemporary Photography.

== Awards ==
- 1984: The Cultural Award from the German Society for Photography (DGPh)

== Legacy ==
With Albert Plécy and Raymond Grosset in 1954 Lartigue founded the Gens d'images, an association recognising those who, in a private or professional capacity, are concerned by still or moving images in any medium, which are pretexts for reflection and debate. It offers two awards for photography; the Niépce, and the Nadar Prizes.

Lartigue's son Dani, a painter and a noted entomologist specializing in butterflies, was patron of La Maison des Papillons, a small museum on a very narrow street in St. Tropez containing paintings and souvenirs of his father and a large artistically presented collection of butterflies.

American director Wes Anderson is a fan of Lartigue's work, and has referenced it in his films. A shot in Rushmore is based on one of his photographs, and Lartigue's likeness was the basis for the portrait of Lord Mandrake in The Life Aquatic with Steve Zissou. 'Zissou' was also Lartigue's nickname for his brother Maurice.

A station on the T2 tram line in Issy-les-Moulineaux in southwestern Paris is named after Lartigue, adjacent to a street also named after him.
