= Willy Ronis =

French photographer (1910–2009)

- Born: 14 August 1910; Paris, France
- Died: 12 September 2009 (aged 99); Paris, France
- Known for: photography
- Spouse: Marie-Anne Lansiaux (m. 1946–1991)
- Awards: Venice Biennale (1957); Grand Prix des Arts et Lettres (1979); Prix Nadar (1979)

Willy Ronis (French: [wili ʁɔnis]; 14 August 1910 – 12 September 2009) was a French photographer. His best-known work shows life in post-war Paris and Provence.

== Life and work ==
Ronis was born in Paris on 14 August 1910, to Jewish immigrants. His father, Emmanuel Ronis, was from Odessa, and his mother, Ida Gluckmann, was from Lithuania. His father opened a photography studio in Montmartre, and his mother gave piano lessons. The boy's early interest was music and he hoped to become a composer. Ronis' passion for music has been observed in his photographs.

Returning from compulsory military service in 1932, his violin studies were put on hold because his father's cancer required Ronis to take over the family portrait business. The work of the photographers Alfred Stieglitz and Ansel Adams inspired Ronis to begin exploring artistic photography. His father died in 1936, whereupon Ronis sold the business and set up as a freelance photographer, his first work being published in Regards.

In 1937 he met David Seymour and Robert Capa, and did his first work for Plaisir de France; in 1938–39 he reported on a strike at Citroën and traveled in the Balkans. With Henri Cartier-Bresson, Ronis belonged to Association des Écrivains et Artistes Révolutionnaires, and remained a political leftist. In 1946 Ronis joined the photo agency Rapho, with Brassaï, Robert Doisneau and Ergy Landau, and was instrumental in forming the professional association Le Groupe des XV, and later joined Les 30 x 40, Club Photographique de Paris. Ronis became the first French photographer to work for Life.

Ronis' nudes and fashion work (for Vogue and Le Jardin des modes) show his appreciation for natural beauty; meanwhile, he remained a principled news photographer, resigning from Rapho for a 25-year period when he objected to the hostile captioning by The New York Times to his photograph of a strike.

Despite stiff competition from Robert Doisneau and others, Ronis was named by the Oxford Companion to the Photograph "the photographer of Paris par excellence".

Ronis began teaching in the 1950s, and taught at the School of Fine Arts in Avignon, Aix-en-Provence and Saint Charles, Marseilles.

In 1953, Edward Steichen included Ronis, Cartier-Bresson, Robert Doisneau, Izis, and Brassaï in an exhibition at the Museum of Modern Art titled Five French Photographers. In 1955, Ronis was included in The Family of Man exhibition. The Venice Biennale awarded him its Gold Medal in 1957. Ronis began teaching in the 1950s, and taught at the School of Fine Arts in Avignon, Aix-en-Provence where he met Pierre-Jean Amar and Saint Charles, Marseilles. In 1979 he was awarded the Grand Prix des Arts et Lettres for Photography by the Minister for Culture. Ronis won the Prix Nadar in 1981 for his photobook, Sur le fil du hasard.

Ronis continued to live and work in Paris, although he stopped photography in 2001, since he required a cane to walk and could not move around with his camera. He also worked on books for the publisher Taschen.

In 2005–2006 the Paris city hall held Willy Ronis in Paris, a retrospective exhibition of his work, that had more than 500,000 visitors. There was also an exhibition at Rencontres d'Arles festival, Arles, France, in 2009.

Ronis died in Paris on 12 September 2009, at the age of 99.

In 2005–2006 the Paris city hall held a retrospective exhibition of his work, that had more than 500,000 visitors.

== Marie-Anne ==
Ronis' wife, the Communist militant painter Marie-Anne Lansiaux (1910–91), was the subject of his well-known 1949 photograph, Nu provençal (Provençal nude). The photograph, taken in a house that Marie-Anne and he had just bought in Gordes, showed Marie-Anne washing at a basin with a water pitcher on the floor and an open window through which the viewer can see a garden, this is noted for its ability to convey an easy feeling of Provençal life. The photograph was a "huge success"; Ronis would comment, "The destiny of this image, published constantly around the world, still astonishes me." Ronis lived in Provence from the 1960s to the 1980s.

Late in her life, Ronis photographed Marie-Anne suffering from Alzheimer's disease, sitting alone in a park surrounded by autumn trees.

== Legacy ==
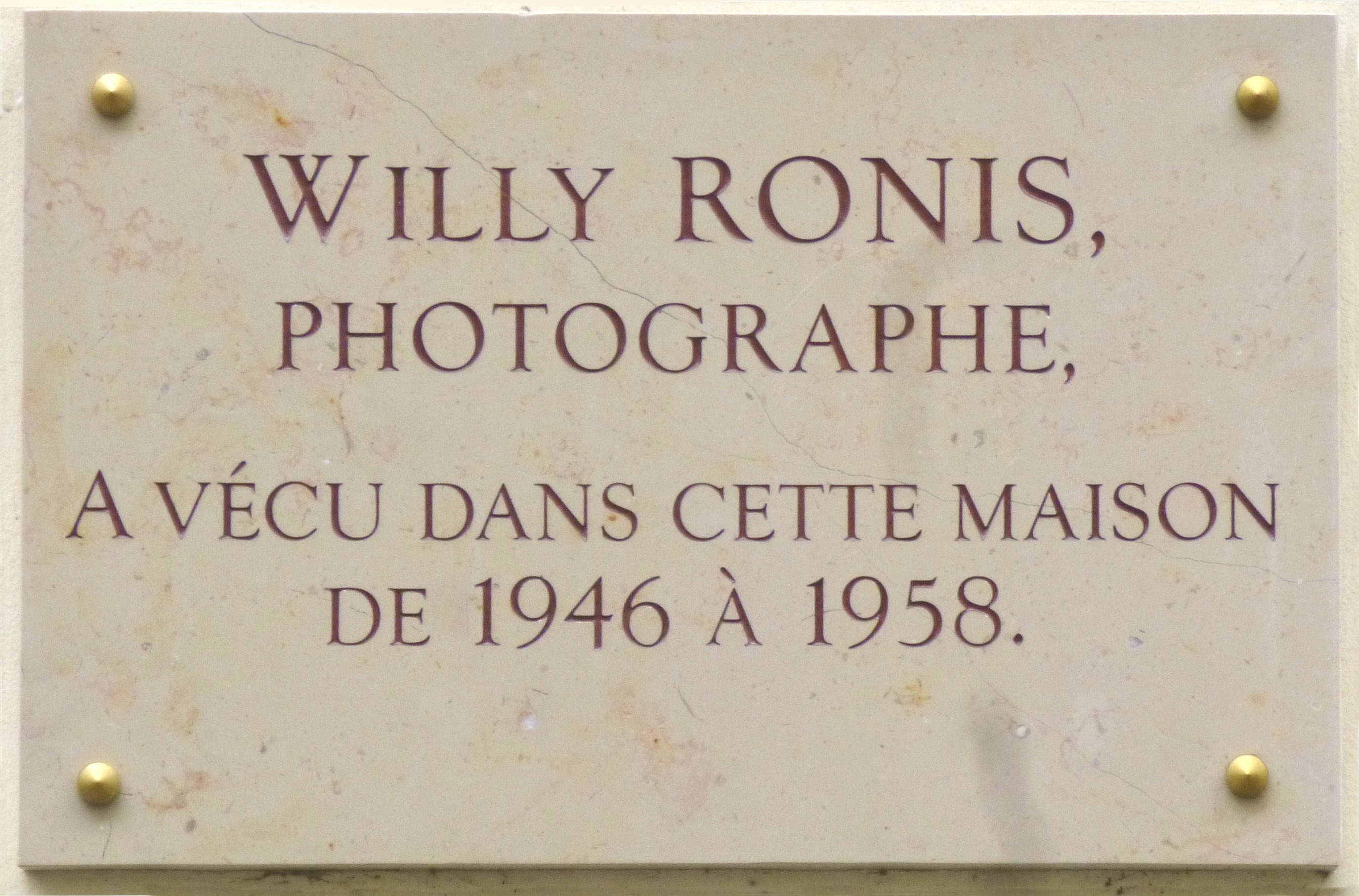
Plaque installed in 2019 on his residence, Passage des Charbonniers (Paris, 15th arrondissement).

Since his death, Ronis' work has been exhibited worldwide, and his images are featured in the collections of major museums.

He bequeathed his photographic work to France through two donations (1983 and 1989) and a will. Recognizing the potential use of his photographs, he appointed four executors in his will, who hold the moral rights to his work and are responsible for overseeing its use. Additionally, his grandson, Stéphane Kovalsky, inherited the reserved portion.

At the completion of the succession settlement, the Médiathèque du patrimoine et de la photographie holds the entire body of his work: 82,000 negatives, 6,000 color slides, 18,000 prints, 6 albums containing 590 reference prints, 26 archival boxes, 720 library volumes, and 400 periodical volumes.

Since 2015, a street in the 20th arrondissement of Paris has been named after him, called the "Belvédère Willy-Ronis".

== Publications ==
- Photo-reportage et chasse aux images. Paris: Publications Photo-Cinéma Paul Montel, 1951.
- Belleville-Ménilmontant. Grenoble: Arthaud, 1954. Paris: Arthaud, 1984. ISBN 2-7003-0486-1. Paris: Arthaud, 1989. Paris: Hoëbeke, 1999. ISBN 2-84230-081-5.
- Îles de Paris. [N.p.]: Arthaud, 1957.
- Paris. Paris: Arthaud, 1962.
- Paris in Colour. London: Allen & Unwin, 1964.
- Paris in Color. Chicago: Rand McNally, 1964.
- Sur le fil du hasard. Paris: Contrejour, 1980. ISBN 2-85949-033-7.
- Willy Ronis. [N.p.]: Galerie municipale du Château d'eau, c.1981. ISBN 2-903116-19-9.
- Willy Ronis. Paris: P. Belfond, 1983. ISBN 2-7144-1604-7.
- Willy Ronis par Willy Ronis. Paris: Association française pour la diffusion du patrimoine photographique, 1985.
- Mon Paris. Paris: Denoël, 1985. ISBN 2-207-23166-6.
- La Traversée de Belleville. Paris: Le Bar floréal, 1990.
- Willy Ronis. Paris: Centre national de la photographie, 1991. ISBN 2-86754-066-6.
- Willy Ronis, 1934-1987. Paris: Editions Treville, 1991. ISBN 4-8457-0688-1.
- Portrait de Saint-Benoît-du-Sault. Paris: Calmann-Lévy; Versailles: Editions P. Olivieri, 1992.
- Toutes belles. Paris: Editions Hoëbeke, 1992. ISBN 2-905292-49-0.
- Willy Ronis: Photographs, 1926-1995. Oxford: Museum of Modern Art, 1995. ISBN 978-0-905836-89-8. The ISBN in the book (0-905836-89-X) is misprinted. Published to accompany a touring exhibition, Willy Ronis: Photographs 1926–1995. Edited by Peter Hamilton; preface by Willy Ronis; foreword by David Elliott; essay, "Introduction", by Peter Hamilton.
- Willy Ronis: 70 ans de déclics. Paris: Musées de la ville de Paris, 1996. ISBN 2-87900-318-0.
- A nous la vie! 1936–1958. Paris: Hoëbeke, 1996. ISBN 2-84230-009-2.
- Vivement Noël! Paris: Hoëbeke, 1996. ISBN 2-84230-020-3.
- Autoportrait. Cognac: Fata Morgana, 1996. ISBN 2-85194-411-8.
- Les Sorties du dimanche. Paris: Nathan, 1997. ISBN 2-09-754204-2.
- Provence. Paris: Hoëbeke, 1998. ISBN 2-84230-036-X.
- Sundays by the River. Washington, D.C.: Smithsonian Institution Press, 1999. ISBN 1-56098-887-8.
- Willy Ronis: Marie-Anne, Vincent et moi. Trézélan: Filigranes éd., 1999. ISBN 2-910682-76-5.
- Sur le fil du hasard, rétrospective: Willy Ronis photographies. Antony: Maison des Arts, 1999.
- Belleville Ménilmontant. Paris: Hoëbeke, 1999. ISBN 2-84230-081-5.
- Mémoire textile. Strasbourg: La Nuée bleue, 2000. ISBN 2-7165-0538-1.
- Willy Ronis for Press Freedom. London: Reporters without borders, 2001. ISBN 2-908830-61-2.
- Derrière l'objectif de Willy Ronis: Photos et propos. Paris: Hoëbeke, 2001. ISBN 2-84230-123-4.
- Willy Ronis 55. London: Phaidon, 2002. ISBN 0-7148-4167-6.
- Willy Ronis: "La vie en passant". Munich: Prestel, 2004. ISBN 3-7913-2930-8.
- Le Val et les bords de Marne. Paris: Terrebleue, 2004. ISBN 2-913019-30-7.
- Willy Ronis: Stolen Moments / Gestohlene Augenblicke / Instants dérobés. Cologne: Taschen, 2005. ISBN 3-8228-3958-2.
- Willy Ronis: Paris, éternellement. Paris: Hoëbeke, 2005. ISBN 2-84230-245-1.
- Willy Ronis. Barcelona: Obra Social Fundacioń "La Caixa", 2006. Texts by Willy Ronis, Marta Gili, Virginie Chardin ISBN 84-7664-901-0.
- Ce jour-la. Paris: Mercure de France, 2006. ISBN 2-7152-2661-6. Paris: Gallimard, 2008. ISBN 978-2-07-035862-5.
- Les Chats de Willy Ronis. Paris: Flammarion, 2007. ISBN 2-08-120687-0.
- Nues. with Philippe Sollers Paris: Terre bleue, 2008. ISBN 978-2-909953-22-9.

== Exhibitions ==
- Five French Photographers. MoMA, New York. 18 December 1951 - 24 February 1952
- Postwar European Photography. MoMA, New York. 26 May - 23 August 1953
- The Family of Man. MoMA, New York. 24 January - 8 May 1955
- Willy Ronis:Paris. Dina Mitrani Gallery, Miami, Florida. 10 October 2012 - 11 January 2013
- Toujours Paris. Peter Fetterman Gallery, New York. 27 October 2018 - 23 February 2019

== See also ==
- Saint-Benoît-du-Sault
