= Denis Brihat =

French photographer (1928–2024)

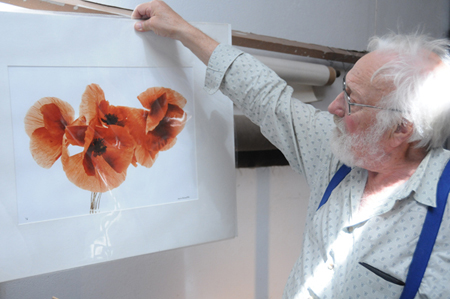
- Brihat in 2010
- Born: 16 September 1928; 16th arrondissement of Paris, France
- Died: 3 December 2024 (aged 96); Bonnieux, France
- Education: École Technique de Cinématographie et de Photographie
- Occupation: Photographer

Denis Brihat (16 September 1928 – 3 December 2024) was a French photographer. He was the 1957 recipient of the Niépce Prize.

Brihat died in Bonnieux on 3 December 2024, at the age of 96.

== Public collection ==
- Tulipe noire (1977, Musée d'Art de Toulon)

== Book ==
- Le Jardin du monde (2005)

== Exhibitions ==
- Au bonheur des fleurs (2012)
- Fragments d'un paradis (2019)
- Denis Brihat, photographies – De la nature des choses (2019)
- Inde 1955 (2019)
- With love from India (2019–2020)
- L’Eden de Denis (2020)
- A fleur de sable (2022)
- La nature au cœur (2023)
