= Ergy Landau =

Hungarian-French photographer (1896–1967)

- Self portrait, 1930 (ca)
- Born: 1896; Budapest, Hungary
- Died: 1967 (aged 70–71); Paris, France
- Known for: Photography

Ergy or Erzsy Landau (1896–1967) was a Hungarian-French humanist photographer.

== Biography ==
Born in Budapest, Landau worked in Franz Xaver Setzer's Vienna studio and then in Rudolf Dührkoop's studio in Berlin. She had photographed the German writer Thomas Mann and her painter/photographer friend, László Moholy-Nagy, whom she introduced to the medium. In May 1922 she emigrated to Paris, where she established herself as a portrait photographer. Landau brought the first Rolleiflex to France. Nora Dumas joined Landau's studio in 1929, and Ylla in 1932.

Landau met Charles Rado in 1933. Rado founded the photo press agency Rapho with Landau, Ylla, Brassaï, and Nora Dumas, but was forced to close the agency during World War II. Landau had met Raymond Grosset on holiday in 1930, and introduced him to the other Hungarian photographers in Paris. After World War II Landau encouraged Grosset to restart Rapho.

Landau died in Paris.

== Book ==
Landau, Ergy (1955). Aujourd'hui la Chine. Lausanne: La Guilde du Livre.
