= Robert Doisneau =

French photographer

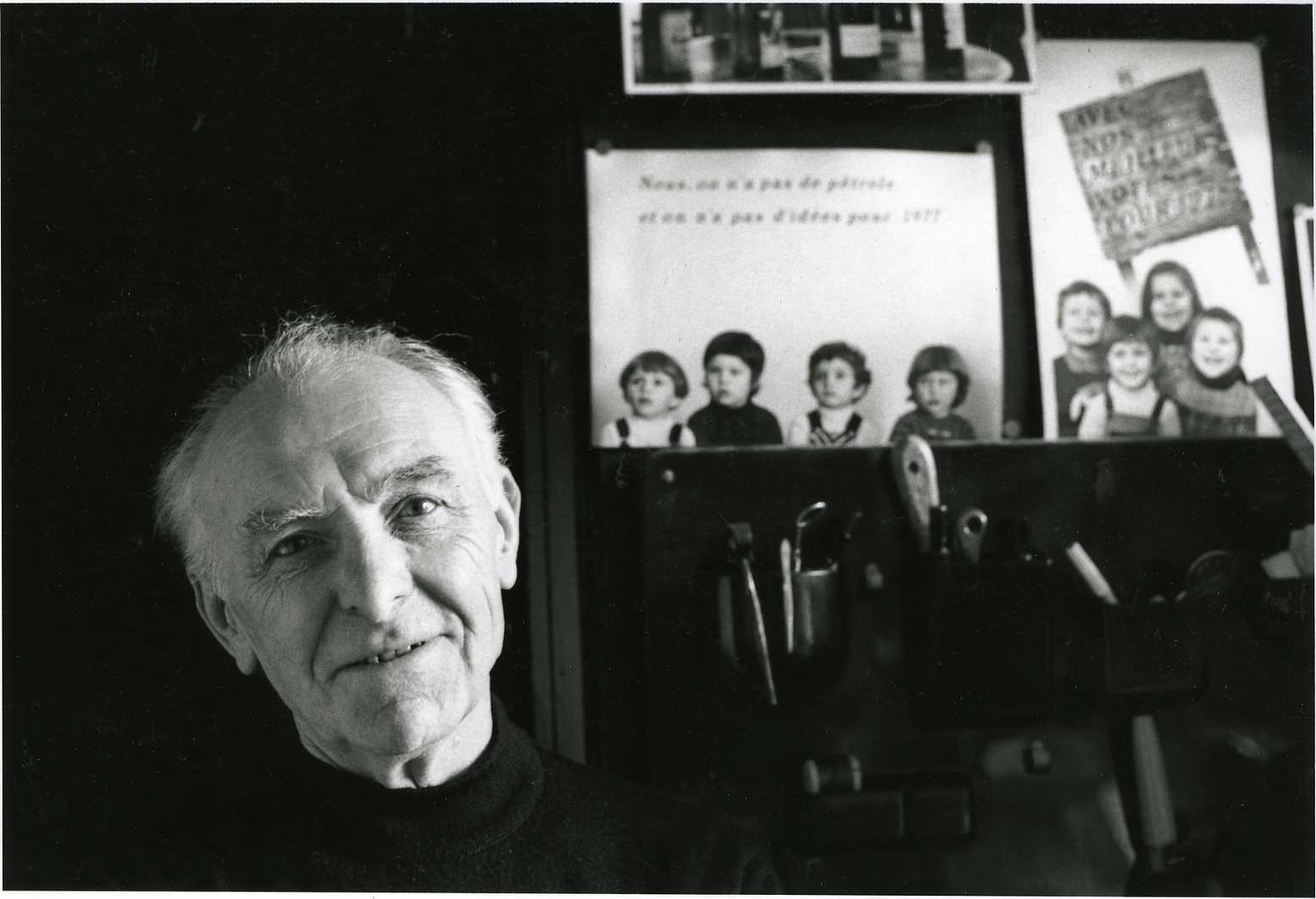
- Doisneau in his studio in Montrouge, 1992
- Born: Robert Doisneau; 14 April 1912; Gentilly, France
- Died: 1 April 1994 (aged 81); Montrouge, France
- Resting place: Raizeux
- Education: École Estienne, 1929 graduate, diplomas in engraving and lithography
- Occupations: Photographer, engraver
- Known for: Street photography, Le baiser de l'hôtel de ville (The kiss by the City Hall)
- Title: Chevalier of the Order of the Legion of Honour

Robert Doisneau (French: [ʁɔbɛʁ dwano]; 14 April 1912 – 1 April 1994) was a French photographer. From the 1930s, he photographed the streets of Paris, France. He was both a champion of humanist photography as well as alongside fellow French photographer, Henri Cartier-Bresson, a pioneer of photojournalism.

Doisneau used irony in images of juxtapositions, mingling social classes, and eccentrics in contemporary Parisian streets and cafés. He was influenced by the work of André Kertész, Eugène Atget, and Henri Cartier-Bresson.

Doisneau is best known for his 1950 image Le baiser de l'hôtel de ville (The Kiss by the City Hall), a photograph of a couple kissing on a busy Parisian street.

He was appointed a Chevalier (Knight) of the Legion of Honour in 1984 by then French president, François Mitterrand.

== Early life ==
Doisneau's father, a plumber, died on active service in World War I, when his son was about four. His mother died when he was seven. He then was raised by an aunt. At 13, he enrolled at the École Estienne. He graduated in 1929 with diplomas in engraving and lithography and took classes in figure drawing and still life.

When he was 16, he took up amateur photography, starting by photographing cobble-stones before progressing to children and then adults.

At the end of the 1920s, Doisneau found work as a draughtsman (lettering artist) at Atelier Ullmann (Ullmann Studio), a creative pharmaceutical graphics studio. He also acted as camera assistant in the studio and then progressed to a staff photographer.

== Career ==
=== Early work ===
In 1931, he left both the studio and advertising, taking a job as an assistant with the modernist photographer, André Vigneau. In 1932, he sold his first photographic story to Excelsior.

Doisneau's work gives prominence to children's street culture; returning to the theme of children at play in the city, unfettered by parents.

Three years later, he began working as an industrial advertising photographer for the Renault car factory in Boulogne-Billancourt. Five years later, in 1939, he was dismissed due to repeated tardiness. He then freelanced in advertising, engraving, and postcard photography. The same year, he was later hired by Rapho, a Parisian photo agency, and traveled throughout France in search of picture stories, eventually taking his first professional street photographs.

In 1991, he said that the years at the Renault car factory marked "the beginning of his career as a photographer and the end of his youth".

=== War service and resistance ===
Doisneau worked for Rapho until the outbreak of World War II, where he was drafted into the French army as both a soldier and photographer. He was in the army until 1940 and, from then until the end of the war in 1945, used his draughtsmanship, lettering artistry, and engraving skills to forge passports and identification papers for the French Resistance.

=== Post-war work ===
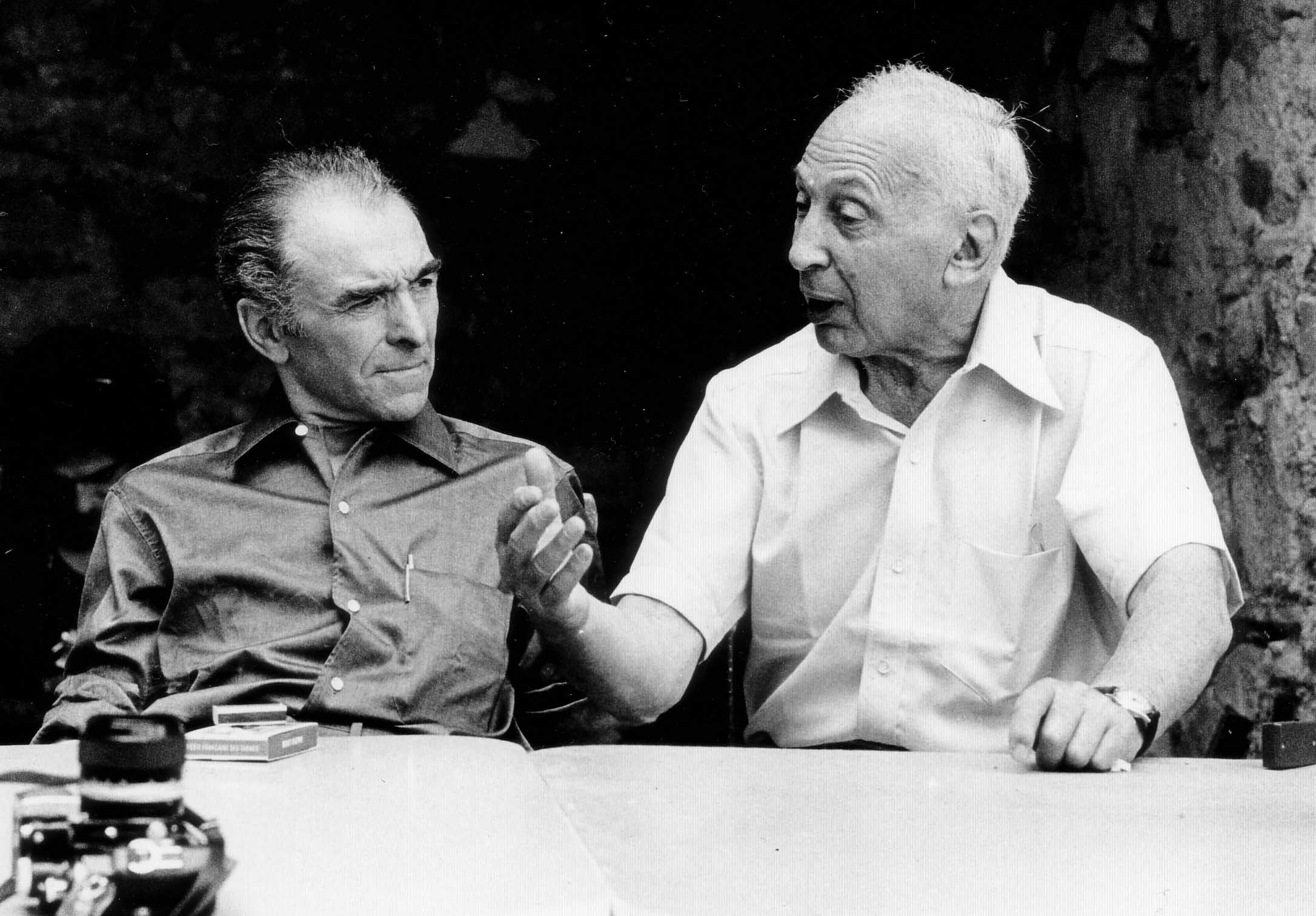
Doisneau (left) and André Kertész in 1975 in Arles, France

Some of Doisneau's most recognizable photographs were taken soon after World War II. He returned to freelance photography and sold photographs to Life and other international magazines. The most notable of which was Le Baiser de l'hôtel de ville (Kiss by the Hôtel de Ville), which became an internationally recognised symbol of young love in Paris. It was published on 12 June 1950 by Life, part of a photo-essay on couples kissing in Paris. The identity of the couple was unknown until 1992.

After the Liberation of France at the end of World War II, Doisneau had refused to photograph women whose heads had been shaved as punishment at the end of the war for sleeping with Germans during the Nazi occupation of France.

He briefly joined the Alliance photo agency but rejoined Rapho in 1946. He remained with them throughout his working life, despite receiving an invitation from Henri Cartier-Bresson to join Magnum Photos.

In 1948, he was contracted by Vogue to work as a fashion photographer.

In 1950, Doisneau joined Le Groupe des XV. Established in 1946 in Paris, the group sought to promote photography as art and to draw attention to the preservation of French photographic heritage. Notable members of the group were: Rene-Jacques, Willy Ronis, and Pierre Jahan. After the group was disbanded, he joined Les 30 x 40, also known as Le Club photographique de Paris.

Doisneau continued to work through the 1970s, producing children's books, advertising photography, and celebrity portraits including Alberto Giacometti, Jean Cocteau, Fernand Léger, Georges Braque, and Pablo Picasso. He also worked with writers and poets such as Blaise Cendrars and Jacques Prévert, crediting the latter with giving him the confidence to photograph everyday street scenes.

== Personal life ==
Doisneau married Pierrette Chaumaison in 1934. The couple had two daughters, Annette (b. 1942) and Francine (b. 1947). From 1979 until his death, Annette worked as his assistant. The two sisters were models for their father from an early age, and now work together to manage his archives and legacy.

Doisneau's wife died in 1993 suffering from Alzheimer's disease and Parkinson's disease. Doisneau died six months later on 1 April 1994, having had a triple heart bypass and also suffering from acute pancreatitis.

Doisneau was thought to be a shy and humble man, similar to his photography. He disagreed with his daughter, Francine, for charging an "indecent" daily fee of £2,000 for his work on a beer advertising campaign– he wanted only the rate of an "artisan photographer".

Throughout his life, Doisneau had lived in the 13th arrondissement of Paris as well as in two of the city's southern suburbs, Gentilly and Montrouge. He is buried in the cemetery at Raizeux beside his wife.

== Awards and commemoration ==
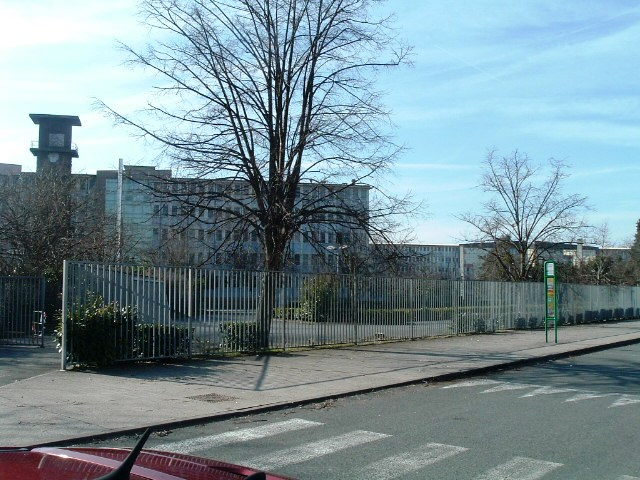
Lycée Robert Doisneau de Corbeil-Essonnes

==== Awards ====
- Kodak Prize, 1947
- Niépce Prize, 1956
- Grand Prix National de la Photographie, 1983
- Balzac Prize, 1986
- Chevalier of the Order of the Legion of Honour, 1984.
- Honorary Fellowship (HonFRPS) from the Royal Photographic Society, 1991.

==== Commemoration ====
- The Maison de la photographie Robert Doisneau in Gentilly, Val-de-Marne, is a photographic art museum named in his honour.
- Several Ecole Primaire are named after him, such as the Ecole élémentaire Robert Doisneau is in Véretz.
- The Allée Robert Doisneau is named in his honour at the Parc de Billancourt on the site of the old Renault factory in Boulogne-Billancourt.
- On 14 April 2012, Google celebrated his 100th birthday with a Google Doodle featuring his photography.

== Publications ==
- Paris délivré par son peuple. (From the People of Paris). Paris: Braun: c.1944.
- La Banlieue de Paris. (The Suburbs of Paris). Text by Blaise Cendrars. Paris: Éditions Pierre Seghers, 1949.
- L'Enfant de Paris. (The Children of Paris). Text by Claude Roy. Neuchâtel: La Baconnière, 1951.
- Sortilèges de Paris. (The magic of Paris). Text by François Cali. Paris: Arthaud, 1952.
- Les Parisiens tels qu’ils sont. (The Parisians as they are.). Text by Robert Giraud and Michel Ragon. Paris: Delpire, 1954.
- Instantanés de Paris. (Snapshots of Paris). Preface by Blaise Cendrars. Paris: Arthaud, 1955.
- 1, 2, 3, 4, 5, Compter en s’amusant. (Fun Counting). Lausanne: La Guilde du Livre, 1955.
  - 1, 2, 3, 4, 5.. Text by Arthur Gregor. Philadelphia: Lippincott, 1956.
  - 1, 2, 3, 4, 5.. Text by Elsie May Harris. London: Nelson, 1962.
- Pour que Paris soit. (This is Paris). Text by Elsa Triolet. Paris: Éditions Cercle d’Art, 1956.
- Gosses de Paris. (Children of Paris). Text by Jean Dongués. Paris: Éditions Jeheber, 1956.
- Robert Doisneau's Paris: 148 Photographs. Text by Blaise Cendrars. New York: Simon & Schuster, 1956.
  - Paris Parade: 148 Photographs. London: Thames & Hudson, 1956.
- Le ballet contre l'opéra. (The Ballet and The Opera). Souillac, Lot: Mulhouse, 1956.
- A.B.C. du dépannage.. N.p.: Société des pétroles Shell Berre, 1958.
- Bistrots. (Bistros). Text by Robert Giraud. Le Point: Revue artistique et littéraire, 57. Souillac, Lot: Mulhouse, 1960.
- Arabie, carrefour des siècles: Album. (Arabia, crossroads of the centuries. An album). Text by Jacques Benoist-Méchin. Lausanne: La Guilde du livre, 1961.
- Nicolas Schöffer.. Text by Guy Habasque and Jacques Ménétrier. Neuchâtel: Éditions du Griffon, 1962.
- Cognac.. Text by Georges Vial. Cognac: Rémy Martin, 1960 (?). (in English)
  - Cognac.. Text by Louise de Vilmorin. Paris: Rémy Martin, 1962. (in French)
- Marius, le forestier. (Marius, the forester. The working men). Text by Dominique Halévy. Les hommes travaillent. Paris: Éditions Fernand Nathan, 1964.
- Henri Cartier-Bresson, Robert Doisneau, André Vigneau: Trois photographes français. Arles: Musée Réattu, 1965.
  - Catalogue of an exhibition at Musée Réattu of Doisneau, Henri Cartier-Bresson, and André Vigneau.
- Épouvantables Épouvantails. (Appalling Scarecrows). Paris: Éditions Hors Mesure, 1965.
- Le Royaume d’argot. (The Kingdom of slang). Text by Robert Giraud. Paris: Denoël, 1966.
- Catherine la danseuse. (Catherine. the dancer). Text by Michèle Manceaux. Paris: Éditions Fernand Nathan, 1966.
- L'École polytechnique. (The Polytechnic). Loos-lez-Lille: L. Danel, 1967.
- L'Oeil objectif. (The eye is a lens). Marseille: Musée Cantini, 1968.
  - Catalogue of an exhibition at Musée Cantini by Doisneau, Denis Brihat, Lucien Clergue, and Jean-Pierre Sudre.
- Le Royaume secret du milieu. (The secret of the middle kingdom). Text by Robert Giraud. Paris: Éditions Planète, 1969.
- My Paris. Text by Chevalier, Maurice. Macmillan Publishers. New York. 1972
- Le Paris de Robert Doisneau et Max-Pol Fouchet. Les éditeurs français réunis. France. 1974
- L’Enfant à la Colombe. (The Child of the Dove). Text by Sage, James. Editions of the Oak. Paris. La Loire. Denoël. Paris. 1978
- Le Mal de Paris. (The Evil of Paris). Text by Lépidis, Clément. Arthaud Publications. Paris. Trois Secondes d’éternité. Contrejour. Paris. 1979
- Ballade pour Violoncelle et Chambre Noir. (A Song for a Cello and a dark room). co-author: Baquet, Maurice. Herscher Editions. Paris. 1980
- Robert Doisneau. Text by Chevrier, Jean-François. Belfond Editions. Paris. 1981
- Passages et Galeries du 19ème Siècle. (Passages and Galleries of the 19th Century). Text by Delvaille, Bernard. Éditions Balland. Paris. 1982
- Doisneau. Photopoche, Centre national de la photographie. France. 1983
- Paysages, Photographies. (Landscapes). (mission photography for DATAR) Éditions Hazan. Paris. 1985
- Un Certain Robert Doisneau. Editions of the Oak. Paris. 1986
- Pour saluer Cendrars. (In honour of Cendrars). Text by Camilly, J. Actes Sud. Arles, France. 1987
- 60 portraits d/artists. (60 portraits of artists). Text by Petit, Jean. Hans Grieshaber Publications. Zürich. 1988
- Doisneau. Quotations by Doisneau collected by Maisonneuve Andre. Éditions Hazan. Paris, France. 1988
- Bonjour Monsieur Le Corbusier. (Hello Mr Le Corbusier). Text by Petit, Jean. Hans Grieshaber Publications. Zürich. 1988
- A l’imparfait de l’objectif. (The imperfect object). Belfond Editions. Paris. 1989
- Les Doigts Pleins d’encre. (Fingers full of ink). Text by Cavanna. Hoëbeke Editions. Paris. 1989
- La Science de Doisneau. (The Science of Robert Doisneau). Hoëbeke Editions. Paris. 1990
- Les Auvergnats. (People of the Auvergne). With Dubois, Jaques. Nathan Images. Paris. 1990
- Lettres à un Aveugle sur des Photographies de Robert Doisneau. (Letters to a blind man about the Photographs of Robert Doisneau). Text by Roumette, Sylvain. 1990
- Le Tout sur le tout/Le Temps qu’il fait. (All about the weather). Paris. 1990
- Le Vin des rues. Text by Robert Giraud. Paris: Denoël, 1990.
- Rue Jacques Prévert. Hoëbeke Editions. Paris, France. 1991
- La Compagnie des Zincs. Text by Carradec, François Carradec. Seghers. Paris. 1991
- Les Grandes Vacances. (Summer vacation). Text by Pennac, Daniel. Hoëbeke Editions. Paris. 1992
- Mes gens de Plume. Writings by Doisneau collected by Dubois, Y. Éditions La Martinière. France. 1992
- Les Enfants de Germinal. (The children of Germinal). Text by Cavanna. Hoëbeke Editions. Paris. 1993 (See also Germinal (month). the downfall)
- Doisneau 40/44. Text by Ory, Pascal. Hoëbeke Editions. Paris. 1994
- La Vie de Famille. (Family life). Text by Ory, Pascal. Hoëbeke Editions. Paris. 1994
- Robert Doisneau ou la Vie d’un photographie. (Robert Doisneau. the life of a photographer. Text by Hamilton, Peter. Hoëbeke Editions. Paris. 1995
- Mes Parisiens. (My Parisians). Nathan Publications. Paris. 1997
- Palm Springs 1960. Paris: Flammarion, 2010. ISBN 978-2-08-030129-1. With a foreword by Jean-Paul Dubois.
- Robert Doisneau, comme un barbare. Text by André Pozner. Paris: Lux Editions, 2012. ISBN 978-2895961475.

== Exhibitions ==
- 1947 Salon de la Photo, Bibliothèque, Paris
- 1951 Exhibition with Brassaї, Willy Ronis, and Izis, Museum of Modern Art, New York
- 1960 Solo exhibition, Museum of Modern Art, Chicago.
- 1965 Exhibition with Daniel Frasnay, Jean Lattès, Jeanine Niépce, Roger Pic, and Willy Ronis, Six Photographes et Paris, Musée des Arts Decoratifs, Paris; Exhibition with Henri Cartier-Bresson and André Vigneau, Musée Réattu, Arles; Solo Exhibition, Bibliothèque Nationale, Paris; Exhibition with D. Brihat, J. P. Sudre, and L. Clergue, Musée Cantini de Marseilles
- 1972 Solo Exhibition, International Museum of Photography at George Eastman House, Rochester, New York
- 1972 Exhibition with Edouard Boubat, Brassaї, Henri Cartier-Bresson, Izis, and Willy Ronis, French Embassy, Moscow
- 1974 Solo Exhibition, University of California at Davis. Solo exhibition, Galerie du Château d’Eau, Toulouse
- 1975 Solo Exhibition, Witkin Gallery, New York; Musée Réattu Arts Décoratifs, Nantes; Musée Réattu, Arles
- 1975 Solo exhibition, Galerie et Fils, Brussels. Solo exhibition, fnac, Lyons; Group exhibition, Expression de l’humor, Boulogne Billancourt; Solo exhibition, Galerie Neugebauer, Basel
- 1976 Exhibition with Brassaї, Cartier-Bresson, Jean-Philippe Charbonnier, Izis, and Marc Riboud, Kraków
- 1977 Solo Exhibition, Brussels; Exhibition with Guy la Querrec, Carlos Freire, Claude Raimond-Dityvon, Bernard Descamps, and Jean Lattès, Six Photographes en quête de banlieue, Centre Georges Pompidou, Paris
- 1978 Solo Exhibition, Ne Bougeons plus, Galerie Agathe Gaillard, Paris; Solo exhibition, Witkin Gallery, New York; Solo exhibition, Musée Nicéphore Niépce, Charlon-sur-Saône
- 1979 Solo Exhibition, Paris, les passants qui passent, Musée d’Art Moderne de la Ville de Paris
- 1980 Solo Exhibition, Amsterdam
- 1981 Solo Exhibition, Witkin Gallery, New York
- 1982 Solo Exhibition, Portraits, Foundation Nationale de la Photographie, Lyons; Solo exhibition, French Embassy, New York; Solo exhibition, Robert Doisneau, Photographe de banlieue, Town Hall, Gentilly
- 1982 Solo exhibition of 120 photographs, Palace of Fine Arts, Beijing, Exhibition of portraits, Tokyo; Solo exhibition, Robert Doisneau, Photographie du dimanche, Institut Lumière, Lyon
- 1986 Group Exhibition, De Vogue à femme, Rencontres Internationales de la Photographie d’Arles
- 1987 Solo Exhibition, St.-Denis, Musée de St.-Denis; Solo exhibition, The National Museum of Modern Art, Kyoto
- 1988 Solo Exhibition, A Homage to Robert Doisneau, Villa Medicis, Rome
- 1989 Solo Exhibition, Doisneau-Renault, Grande Halle de la Villette, Paris
- 1990 Solo Exhibition, La Science de Doisneau, Jardin des Plantes, Paris
- 1992 Solo Exhibition, Robert Doisneau: A Retrospective, Modern Art Oxford
- 1993 The Summerlee Heritage Trust, Coatbridge, Scotland; Royal Festival Hall, London; Manchester City Art Gallery; O Mes da Fotografie Festival, Convento do Beato, Lisbon, Portugal; Musée Carnavalet, Paris
- 1994 "Hommage à Robert Doisneau", festival des Rencontres d'Arles, France
- 1994 Musée d’Art Contemporain de Montréal, Canada; Galway Arts Centre, Ireland; Solo exhibition, A Homage to Robert Doisneau, Galerie du Château d’Eau à Toulouse; Solo exhibition, Doisneau 40/44, Centre d’Histoire de la Résistance et de la Déportation de Lyon, Lyon, France; Solo exhibition, Robert Doisneau ou la désobéissance, Ecomusée de Fresnais
- 1995 Museum of Modern Art, Oxford, England; Aberdeen Art Gallery, Scotland; The Mead Gallery, Warwick Arts Centre, Coventry
- 1996 Solo Exhibition, Montpellier Photo-Visions, Galerie Municipale de la Photographie; Isetan Museum of Art, Tokyo; Daimaru Museum, Osaka, Japan
- 2000 Exhibition, Gravités, Paris
- 2000 Exhibition, Galerie Claude Bernard, Paris
- 2002 Exhibition, Museo Nacional de Bellas Artes, Santiago, Chile
- 2003 Exhibition, Budapest, Hungary; Exhibition, Bucarest, Romania
- 2003 Exhibition, Galerie Claude Bernard, Paris
- 2005 Solo Exhibition, Robert Doisneau from the Fictional to the Real, Bruce Silverstein Gallery, New York
- 2005 Solo Exhibition, Robert Doisneau, Galerie Claude Bernard, Paris
- 2010 Solo Exhibitions, Robert Doisneau, Du metier a l'oeuvre, Fondation Henri Cartier-Bresson, 2, Impasse Lebouis, 75014 Paris
- 2010 Group Exhibition, Discoveries, Robert Doisneau, Bruce Silverstein Gallery, New York
- 2010 Solo Exhibition, Robert Doisneau, the fisherman of images, the Space for Art of Caja Madrid Zaragoza, Aranjuez, Madrid
- 2011 Group exhibition: Night, Robert Doisneau Bruce Silverstein Gallery, New York
- 2014 exhibition : The moments that he loved, sangsangmadang, Seoul
- 2015 exhibition : Robert Doisneau, a photographer at the museum, Grande Galerie de l'Évolution, Paris

== Films about Doisneau ==
A short film, Le Paris de Robert Doisneau, was made in 1973.

In 1992 the French actress and producer Sabine Azéma made the film Bonjour Monsieur Doisneau.
