= Humanist photography =

Photography genre

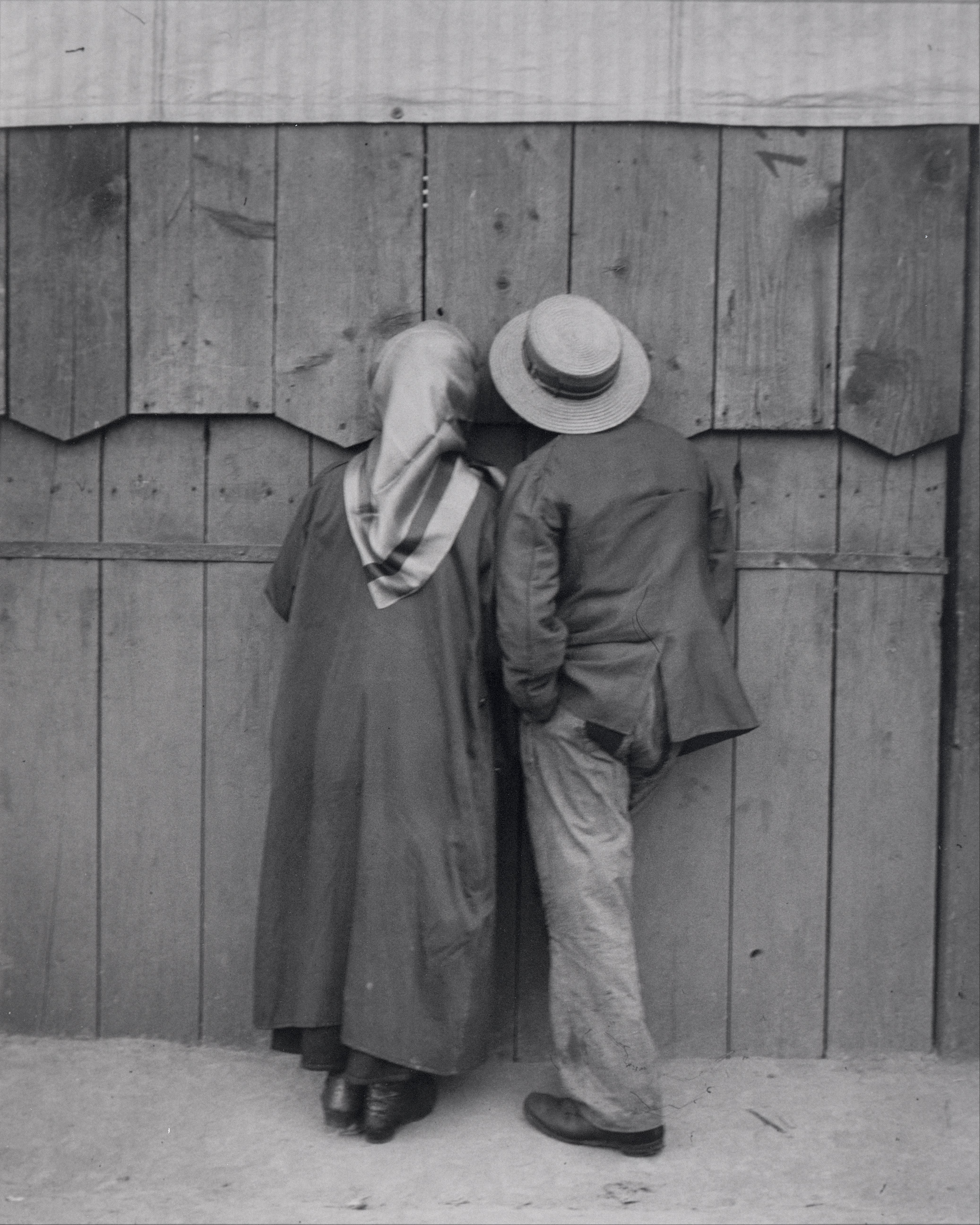
- André Kertész (19 May 1920) Circus, Budapest
- Years active: 1920s–1960s
- Location: France, with influences worldwide
- Major figures: Werner Bischof, Édouard Boubat, Brassaï, Henri Cartier-Bresson, Jean-Philippe Charbonnier, Robert Doisneau,Gilles Peress, * Marc Riboud, Willy Ronis, Sabine Weiss, Véro (Werner Rosenberg
- Influences: Humanism, Popular Front (France), French Fourth Republic, 35mm photography
- Influenced: Photojournalism, Poetic realism, contemporary street photography

Humanist Photography, also known as the School of Humanist Photography, manifests the Enlightenment philosophical system in social documentary practice based on a perception of social change. It emerged in the mid-twentieth-century and is associated most strongly with Europe, particularly France.

It can be distinguished from photojournalism, with which it forms a sub-class of reportage, as it is concerned more broadly with everyday human experience, to witness mannerisms and customs, than with newsworthy events, though practitioners are conscious of conveying particular conditions and social trends, often, but not exclusively, concentrating on the underclasses or those disadvantaged by conflict, economic hardship or prejudice. Humanist photography "affirms the idea of a universal underlying human nature". Jean Claude Gautrand describes humanist photography as:

a lyrical trend, warm, fervent, and responsive to the sufferings of humanity [which] began to assert itself during the 1950s in Europe, particularly in France ... photographers dreamed of a world of mutual succour and compassion, encapsulated ideally in a solicitous vision.

== Historical context ==
Humanist photography follows a lineage of such imagery in French art, the concern with the lives of 'common citizens' as in The Third Class Carriage, of Honoré Daumier, an artist in whom Henri Cartier-Bresson and his compatriots found inspiration.

After World War I came a boom in photography which served to satisfy a curiosity about human existence after a conflict that killed so many and whose absence prompted those left to question the meaning of existence against an Industrial expansion which changed not only the environment but the norms of society. Photography in the 1920s sought new values and forms, and in the 1920s and 1930s a whole generation of photographers made their debut. Though they never identified themselves as belonging to a 'school', signed a manifesto, or expressed their ideas in formal texts, they were animated by the optimism of the Popular Front of 1936 (many being communists), and the spirit and rawness working class neighbourhoods, of the classe populaire, finding there a hidden, poetic beauty. Photographing on the street or in the bistro primarily in black‐and‐white in available light with the popular small cameras of the day, these image-makers discovered what the writer Pierre Mac Orlan (1882-1970) called the 'fantastique social de la rue' (social fantasticality of the street) and their style of image conveyed a compassion for the way of life of ordinary European people, particularly in Paris.

Humanist photography in France, between 1930 and 1960, developed an identity and continuity which makes it a recognised historical movement, allied in tone to the term 'Poetic Realism,' as used by André Bazin to describe the French cinema of Jacques Feyder, Jean Renoir, Julien Duvivier, and Marcel Carné with the poet/screenwriter Jacques Prévert, between 1930 and 1945, and exemplified in such films as Quai des Brumes and Hôtel du Nord of 1938. Accordingly, Hamilton argues that this was 'a photography of the cultural, a body of images which created a system of representations of what made France French in a particular era'.

== Philosophical foundation ==
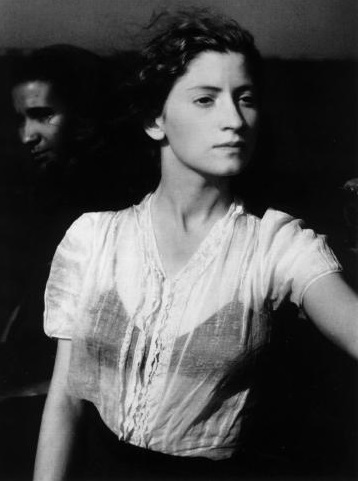
Edouard Boubat (1947) Lella, Bretagne

The preoccupation with everyday life emerged after World War I during the interwar period. As a reaction to the atrocities of the trenches, Paris became a haven for intellectual, cultural and artistic life, attracting artists from the whole of Europe and the United States. With the release of the first Leica and Contax range-finder cameras, photographers took to the street and documented life by day and night. Such photographers as André Kertész, Brassaï, Henri Cartier-Bresson emerged during the period between the two world wars thanks to the Illustrated Press (Vu and Regards). Having been brought to notice by the Surrealists and Berenice Abbott, the life work of Eugène Atget in the empty streets of Paris also became a reference.

At the end of World War II, in 1946, French intellectuals Jean-Paul Sartre and André Malraux embraced humanism; Sartre argued that existentialism was a humanism entailing freedom of choice and a responsibility for defining oneself, while at the Sorbonne in an address sponsored by UNESCO, Malraux depicted human culture as 'humanisme tragique', a battle against biological decay and historical disaster.

Emerging from brutal global conflict, survivors desired material and cultural reconstruction and the appeal of humanism was a return to the values of dignity, equality and tolerance symbolised in an international proclamation and adoption of the Universal Declaration of Human Rights by the General Assembly of the United Nations in Paris on 10 December 1948. That the photographic image could become a universal language in accord with these principles was a notion circulated at a UNESCO conference in 1958

== Emergence ==
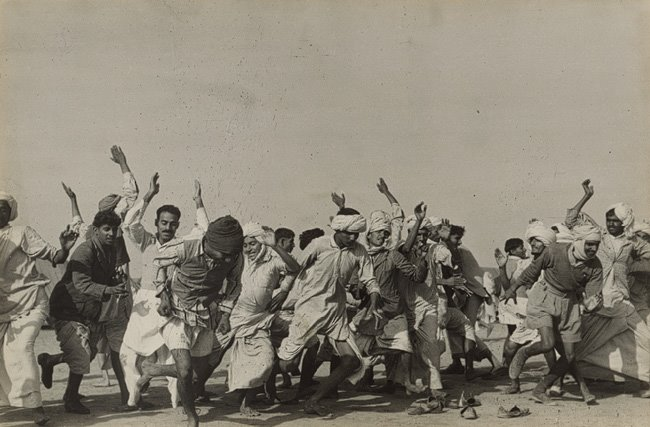
Henri Cartier-Bresson (1947) Dancing Refugees at Kurukshetra camp, Punjab.

As France in particular, but also Belgium and the Netherlands, emerged from the dark period of the Occupation (1940–4), the liberation of Paris in August 1944 released photographers to respond to reconstruction and the Fourth Republic's (1947–59) drive to redefine a French identity after war, defeat, occupation, and collaboration, and to modernise the country. For photographers the experience had been one in which the Nazi authorities censored all visual expression and the Vichy carefully controlled those who remained; and who eked out a living with portraiture and commercial, officially endorsed editorial photography, though individuals joined the Resistance from 1941, including Robert Capa, Cartier-Bresson, and Jean Dieuzaide, with several forging passes and documents (amongst whom were Robert Doisneau, Hans Bellmer, and Adolfo Kaminsky).

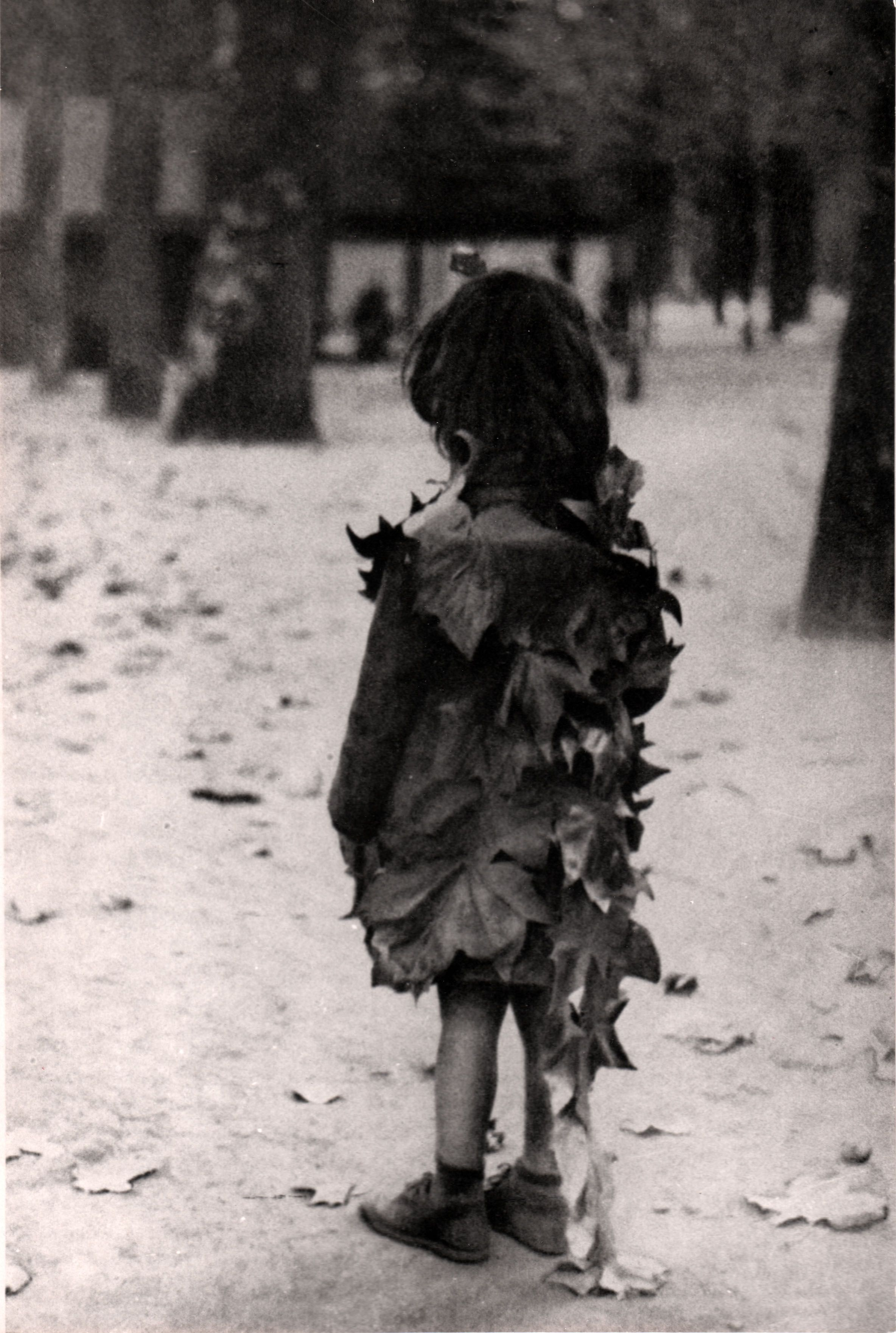
Edouard Boubat (1947) La petite fille aux feuilles mortes ('Little girl wearing dead leaves'), Paris.

Paris was a crossroad of modernist culture and so cosmopolitan influences abound in humanist photography, recruiting emigrés who impressed their stamp on French photography, the earliest being Hungarian André Kertész who arrived on the scene in the mid-1920s; followed by his compatriots Ergy Landau, Brassai (Gyula Halasz), and Robert Capa (Endre Friedmann), and by the Pole "Chim" Seymour (Dawid Szymin), among others, in the 1930s. The late 1940s and 50s saw a further influx of foreign photographers sympathetic to this movement, including Ed van der Elsken from the Netherlands who recorded the interactions at the bistrot Chez Moineau, the dirt-cheap refuge of bohemian youths and of Guy Debord, Michele Bernstein, Gil J. Wolman, Ivan Chtcheglov and the other members of the Letterist International and the emerging Situationists whose theory of the dérive accords with the working method of the humanist street photographer.

== Picture magazines, reportage and the photoessay ==
Humanist photography emerged and spread after the rise of the mass circulation picture magazines in the 1920s and as photographers formed fraternities such as Le Groupe des XV (which exhibited annually 1946-1957), or joined agencies which promoted their work and fed the demand of the newspaper and magazine audiences, publishers and editors before the advent of television broadcasting which rapidly displaced these audiences at the close of the 1960s. These publications include the Berliner Illustrirte Zeitung, Vu, Point de Vue, Regards, Paris Match, Picture Post, Life, Look, Le Monde illustré, Plaisir de France and Réalités which competed to give ever larger space to photo-stories; extended articles and editorials that were profusely illustrated, or that consisted solely of photographs with captions, often by a single photographer, who would be credited alongside the journalist, or who provided written copy as well as images.

== Photobooks and literary connections ==
Iconic books appeared including Doisneau's Banlieue de Paris (1949), Izis's Paris des rêves (1950), Willy Ronis' Belleville‐Ménilmontant (1954), and Cartier‐Bresson's Images à la sauvette (1952); better known by its English title, which defines the photographic orientation of all these photographers, The Decisive Moment).

== Exhibitions ==
While photography exhibitions and salons of photography in France were devoted to the medium as a fine art and rarely represented this genre, national and international exposure of humanist photography was accelerated post-WW2 through exhibitions. Of particular importance in this regard is The Family of Man, a vast travelling exhibition curated by Edward Steichen for MoMA, which presented a unifying humanist manifesto in the form of images selected from amongst, literally, a million. Thirty-one French photographs appeared in The Family of Man, a contribution representing almost one-third of the European photography in the show.

Steichen said that based on his experience of meeting photographers in Europe as he sought images of ‘everydayness' which he defined as 'the beauty of the things that fill our lives', for the exhibition, that the French were the only photographers who had thoroughly photographed scenes of daily life. These were practitioners he admired for their conveying 'tender simplicity, a sly humor, a warm enthusiasm ... and convincing aliveness'. In turn, this exposure in The Family of Man inspired a new generation of humanist photographers.

- 1946–1957 Le Groupe des XV (Marcel Amson, Jean Marie Auradon, Marcel Bovis, Louis Caillaud, Yvonne Chevallier, Jean Dieuzaide, Robert Doisneau, André Garban, Édith Gérin, René-Jacques (René Giton), Pierre Jahan, Henri Lacheroy, Therese Le Prat, Lucien Lorelle, Daniel Masclet, Philippe Pottier, Willy Ronis, Jean Séeberger, René Servant, Emmanuel Sougez, François Tuefferd) exhibited annually in Paris.
- 1951: During his visit to Europe collecting photographs for The Family of Man, Edward Steichen mounted the exhibition Five French Photographers: Brassai; Cartier-Bresson, Doisneau, Ronis, Izis at MoMA December 1951-24 February 1952.
- 1953: Steichen presented a second exhibition Post-war European Photography at MoMA, 27 May-2 August 1953.
- 1955: Steichen drew on large numbers of European humanist and American humanistic photographs for his exhibition The Family of Man, proclaimed as a compassionate portrayal of a global family, which toured the world.
- 1982: Paris 1950: photographié par le Groupe des XV, exhibition at the Bibliothèque historique de la ville de Paris, 5 November 1982 – 29 janvier 1983.
- 1996: In April 1996, the inaugural exhibition of the Maison de la Photographie Robert Doisneau, entitled This Is How Men Live: Humanism and Photography presented 80 photographers from 17 different countries and covered a period from 1905 to today. The Maison de la Photographie Robert Doisneau has been dedicated to humanist photography inspired by revisiting the concept, including all countries and eras.
- 2006: The exhibition The humanistic picture (1945-1968) featuring Izis, Boubat, Brassaï, Doisneau, Ronis, et al. took place in the Mois de Photo festival from 31 October 2006 to 28 January 2007 at the BNF, Site Richelieu.

== Humanist photography outside France ==
=== England ===
The British, exposed to much the same threats and conflict as the rest of Europe during the first half of the century, in their popular magazine Picture Post (1938–1957) did much to promote the humanist imagery of Bert Hardy, Kurt Hutton, Felix H. Man (aka Hans Baumann), Francis Reiss, Thurston Hopkins, John Chillingworth, Grace Robertson, and Leonard McCombe, who eventually joined Life Magazine's staff. Its founder Stefan Lorant explained his motivation;

“Father was a humanist. When I lost him in the war, it changed me. He was in his forties, and I changed. I championed the cause of the common man, for people who were not as well off as myself”

=== United States ===
The movement is in marked contrast to the contemporaneous ‘art’ photography of the USA, which was a country less directly exposed to the trauma that inspired the humanist philosophy, though its photographers were exposed to examples of the genre from Europe. Justin Spring, reviewing in Aperture a 1997 Cartier-Bresson show at Bruce Museum, remarks on his 1935 visit to exhibit at Julien Levy Gallery, followed by a year studying film with Paul Strand. Of Bresson's exhibited series from a return trip from New York to Los Angeles in 1947 Spring writes:

The show may tell us less about America, however, than it does about Cartier-Bresson: the evolution of his light-handed style, and his consistent preoccupation with humanist themes...The tone is decidedly cosmopolitan if, curiously enough, somewhat foreign. Individuals strike stereotypically “Gallic” poses and gestures; the bony limbs and haggard features of the gesticulating crone wearing the Stars and Stripes in Fourth of July, Cape Cod, 1947, recalls the expressive quality of a character in a Daumier lithograph. There are occasional lapses in comprehension as well: Cartier-Bresson seems in search of a European bourgeois street culture that doesn’t exist in the States.

Nevertheless, there too ran a current of humanism in photography, first begun in the early 20th century by Jacob Riis, then Lewis Hine, followed by the FSA and the New York Photo League [see the Harlem Project led by Aaron Siskind] and The Family of Man photographers who exhibited at Limelight gallery.

As in France, the picture press was instrumental in disseminating humanist photography. Books were published such as those by Dorothea Lange and Paul Taylor (An American Exodus, 1939), Walker Evans and James Agee (Let Us Now Praise Famous Men, 1941), Margaret Bourke-White and Erskine Caldwell (You Have Seen Their Faces, 1937), Arthur Rothstein and William Saroyan (Look At Us,..., 1967). The seminal work by Robert Frank, The Americans published in France in 1958 (Robert Delpire) and the USA the following year (Grove Press), the result of his two Guggenheim grants, can also be considered an extension of the humanist photography current in the USA which had a demonstrable impact on American photography.

In spite of the Red Scare and McCarthyism in the 1950s (which banned the Photo League) a humanist ethos and vision was promoted by The Family of Man exhibition world tour, and is strongly apparent in W. Eugene Smith's 1950s development of the photo essay, street photography by Helen Levitt, Vivian Maier et al., and later the work by Bruce Davidson (incl. his East 100th Street) and who in 1956 had made early work in Paris, Eugene Richards, and Mary-Ellen Mark from the 50s into the 90s. The W. Eugene Smith Award continues to award humanitarian and humanist photography.

== Characteristics ==
Typically humanist photographers harness the photograph's combination of description and emotional affect to both inform and move the viewer, who may identify with the subject; their images are appreciated as continuing the pre-war tradition of photo reportage as social or documentary records of human experience. It is praised for expressing humanist values such as empathy, solidarity, sometimes humor, and mutual respect of cameraperson and subject in recognition of the photographer, usually an editorial freelancer, as auteur on a par with other artists.

Developments in technology supported these characteristics. The Ermanox with its fast f/1.8 and f/2 lenses (6cm x 4.5cm format, 1924) and the 35mm Leica, 1925) camera, miniaturised and portable, had become available by the end of the 1920s. The medium-format Rolleiflex of 1929, allowed surreptitious shooting from the waist without looking directly at the subject. The 35mm Contax (1936) revolutionised the practice of documentary photography and reportage by enabling the photographer to shoot quickly and unobtrusively in all conditions, to seize images à la sauvette ("images on the run," rendered elsewhere as the "decisive moment") capturing what Cartier-Bresson defined as "the whole essence, in the confines of one single photograph, of some situation that was in the process of unrolling itself before my eyes" and in support of Cornell Capa's notion of "concerned photography", described as "work committed to contributing to or understanding humanity's well-being".

== Decline ==
The humanist current continued into the late 1960s and early 70s, also in the United States when America came to dominate the medium, with photography in academic artistic and art history programs becoming institutionalised in such programs as the Visual Studies Workshop, after which attention turned to photography as a fine art and documentary image-making was interrogated and transformed in Postmodernism.

== Humanist photographers ==
The list below is not exhaustive, but presents photographers that can be partially or totally attached to this movement:

- Ilse Bing
- Werner Bischof
- Édouard Boubat
- Marcel Bovis
- Brassaï
- Henri Cartier-Bresson
- Jean-Philippe Charbonnier
- Peter Cornelius
- Dominique Darbois (Dominique Stern)
- Robert Doisneau
- Henriette Grindat
- Dave Heath
- Frank Horvat
- Izis (Israëlis Bidermanas)
- Pierre Jahan
- Ergy Landau
- Dorothea Lange
- Lucien Lorelle
- Vivian Maier
- René Maltête
- Ervin Marton
- Olivier Meyer
- Inge Morath
- Janine Niépce
- Gilles Peress
- Marc Riboud
- Manuel Rivera-Ortiz
- Willy Ronis
- Émile Savitry
- Roger Schall
- Bill Schwab
- W. Eugene Smith
- Louis Stettner
- Emmanuel Sougez
- Yvette Troispoux
- François Tuefferd
- Sabine Weiss
- Véro (Werner Rosenberg)
