= Laura Oldfield Ford =

English painter

- Born: 1973 (age 52–53); Halifax, West Yorkshire, England
- Education: Slade Art School, Royal College of Art
- Notable work: Savage Messiah
- Website: lauragraceford.blogspot.com

Laura Oldfield Ford (born 1973), also known as Laura Grace Ford, is a British artist and author. Her mixed media and multimedia work, encompassing psychogeography, poetry and prose, photography, ballpoint pen, acrylic paint and spray paint, explores political themes and focuses on British urban areas. Her zine Savage Messiah, which centres on London, was published from 2005 to 2009 and collected as a book in 2011.

== Biography ==
=== Early life ===
Ford was born in Yorkshire in 1973 and grew up in Halifax, West Yorkshire in a community hit by the decline of the textile industry. In Leeds and later in London, she became involved in the punk, rave and squatting scenes and produced zines and posters influenced by Raymond Pettibon, Linder Sterling and Jon Savage. She took her Bachelor of Arts at the Slade School of Fine Art and her Master of Arts at the Royal College of Art (RCA). At the RCA's graduation show in 2007 she exhibited a four-section painting depicting herself in each panel against a backdrop of urban chaos.

=== Work and career ===
Savage Messiah, which takes its name from H. S. Ede's biography of the French sculptor Henri Gaudier-Brzeska, was self-published from 2005 to 2009. Each issue focuses on a different London postcode. Savage Messiah uses the Situationist technique of the dérive: "urban drifts", or walks, during which Oldfield Ford collected images which were then placed alongside both original and found texts, with the purpose of describing places, people and events. In 2008 Owen Hatherley named Savage Messiah 10: Abandoned London as one of his "books of the year", describing it as "an oneiric vision of a depopulated, post-catastrophe capital, pieced together from snatched conversations and reminiscences, set in a landscape of the labyrinthine ruins of 1960s architecture and today's negative-equity banlieue."

The entirety of Savage Messiah, featuring an introduction by Mark Fisher, was published in book form by Verso Books in September 2011. Reviewing the book for The Guardian, Iain Sinclair commented: "Collided into a great block, the catalogue of urban rambles takes on a new identity as a fractured novel of the city" and praised Ford's "authentic gifts as a recorder and mapper of terrain." Summing up Savage Messiah, Sinclair wrote: "In the end, it's about walking as a way of writing, recomposing London by experiencing its secret signs and obstacles." In his review for Eye, Rick Poynor praised her "acutely observant" writing and "assertively linear style of drawing"; concluding, he described the work as "graphic literature of great urgency."

Hari Kunzru listed the Verso publication as a "book of the year" for 2011 and described it as "a wake-up call to anyone who can only see modern cities through the lens of gentrification." In 2012 Greil Marcus described Savage Messiah as a continuation of the work of the Situationists Guy Debord, Ivan Chtcheglov, and Michèle Bernstein, and as "a delirious, doomstruck celebration of squats, riots, vandalism, isolation, alcohol, and sex with strangers, all on the terrain of a half-historical, half-imaginary city that the people who Ford follows, herself at the center, can in moments believe they built themselves, and can tear don as they choose." In a 2013 review for the American Book Review, Sukhdev Sandhu described the Verso publication as an example of "invisible literature" and "avant-pulp psychogeography" able "to rekindle erased histories of popular dissent from the 1970s to the 1990s", and one relevant to "a new and possibly endless age of austerity".

J. D. Taylor has interpreted Savage Messiah as an exploration of themes of surveillance, gentrification and class conflict and the use of architecture as "a cynical strategy of social management and expropriation" and suggested that Ford's work is part of a trend involving the "reclamation of the non-place". Comparing Ford's work to that of Burial, Taylor suggests their representation of "non-times and lost futures" constitutes "a means of imagining an alternative future." Dominic Davies has read Savage Messiah in terms of the account of capitalist realism in Fisher's Capitalist Realism: Is There No Alternative?, noting that Ford rejects literary realism in favour of "a dystopian aesthetic" and fragmented nonlinear narratives. Comparing Savage Messiah to Alan Moore and Eddie Campbell's From Hell, Davies argues that both works draw on London's past to critique its present. Noting the recurrent imagery of eyes in Savage Messiah, Davies sees "the image of the disembodied eyeball ... as a commentary on the proliferation and prevalence of CCTV infrastructure" and "the social ramifications of proliferating levels of security and diminishing public space."

In 2018 Ford described Savage Messiah as "a series of stories; broken narratives that articulated a certain moment, a certain relationship with the city. It was about transience and impermanence, but also about the bonds that form in those moments: kinship, comradeship and love." She described her subsequent work as a continuation of the same project.

A new edition of Verso's Savage Messiah was published in 2019, featuring a new zine about west London in the wake of the Grenfell Tower fire and an introduction by Greil Marcus that identifies Walter Benjamin, Surrealism, the Situationist International and work by Nan Goldin and Andrea Arnold as precursors to Ford's work.

=== Exhibitions ===
From January until March 2009, a collection of her work entitled London 2013, Drifting Through the Ruins, including all ten issues of Savage Messiah, was featured in London's Hales Gallery. Ford was one of three artists whose work was exhibited as part of Slump City at SPACE in London in June 2009. Another exhibition, Britannia 2013–1981 ran in Hatfield from November 2009 until January 2010.

In February 2011, Ford's work was on display in Bristol as a part of Poster Sites, a project commissioned by Arnolfini. She created 11 posters based on dérives in the city; though Arnolfini produced a map and Ford led a walk between them, they were primarily left to be casually witnessed by the public. Also in 2011, her work was featured in Orbitecture, an exhibition at the Grundy Art Gallery in Blackpool.

In 2012 her work was exhibited as part of There Is a Place... at The New Art Gallery in Walsall. Also in 2012, work by Ford inspired by El Raval and protests in Barcelona were featured in Desire Lines at the Espai Cultural Caja Madrid in Barcelona.

In 2014 Ford's work was featured in Soft Estate at The Bluecoat in Liverpool. The same year, her work was included in Ruin Lust at the Tate Britain. Later that year a solo exhibition of paintings and collaged drawings entitled Seroxat, Smirnoff, THC ran at the Stanley Picker Gallery in Surbiton.

Her solo exhibition Chthonic Reverb ran at Grand Union Gallery in Birmingham in 2016. Featuring audio and visual work, the exhibition focuses on Birmingham, where Ford lived in the early 1990s, including Herbert Manzoni's impact on the city and the Big City Plan.

In 2017 Ford's solo exhibition Alpha/Isis/Eden ran at The Showroom in London. The exhibition focused on the effects of urban regeneration in the neighbourhood surrounding the gallery near Edgware Road in central London, and included audio recordings of the area. In 2022, Ford's installation An Undimmed Aura was part of the Somerset House group exhibition The Horror Show.

=== Themes and practice ===
Skye Sherwin of The Guardian writes that Ford's work "focuses on areas haunted by an urban dispossessed, which regeneration seeks to concrete over: city wastelands where fortress-like old tower-blocks rise, with their Escher-like walkways and bleak 'recreational' open spaces." These include the East End of London and the new towns of Harlow, Hatfield and Stevenage. Her work on the East End is critical of the 2012 Summer Olympics, held in London, and the associated development program, in particular the regeneration process surrounding the Olympic Park. Christopher Collier has argued that Ford's work utilises "semi-fictionalised settings of dilapidated blue-collar and immigrant districts of a post-Thatcherite London increasingly ghettoised, defunded and threatened by the state."

Her work also engages with architecture. In a 2009 interview Ford reiterated the centrality of a critique of urban regeneration, and expressed an interest in brutalist architecture (referring specifically to Broadwater Farm in Tottenham and Robin Hood Gardens in Poplar. Ford has argued that brutalism is significant due to "the collective ideals inherent in it: the rethinking and radical reshaping of public space, the idea of cities being conducive to an endless 'derive', the postwar idea that everyone is entitled to a publicly owned house." She also critiqued "an obsession with friendly looking architecture, curved lines, outgrowths of green roof tops, panels and balconies in Scandinavian wood or brightly coloured aluminium", describing these trends as "playschool architecture". In 2018, Ford noted that her recent work was concerned less with inner cities and more with suburbs and urban peripheries: "That's mostly where you have to go now if you want to encounter the former intensity of zones 1 and 2 ... It used to be the inner cities that were sacrificed, ruled by slum landlords, starved of investment and surrounded by circles of unreachable affluence. But in the past decade or so there has been an accelerated reversal of this process."

In the Transactions of the Institute of British Geographers, Andrew Harris wrote that London 2013, Drifting Through the Ruins (2009) "attempts to reactivate more conflictual architectural, political and aesthetic strategies that have been largely erased by the widespread gentrification of London since the 1970s" and is an example of an intervention which offers "an important and neglected resource for complicating, disrupting and re-visioning understandings of urban change". Paul Gravett describes Ford's work as being fuelled by a longing for a past incarnation of the punk subculture and a "recovery of punk's provocation and politicisation".

Contemporary archaeologist James R. Dixon set Ford's February 2011 Arnolfini exhibition against the April 2011 Bristol riot. Dixon saw in her work "the material conditions that can be identified as a contributing factors" in the riot, and noted that rather than being immediately apparent, those conditions are identified by Ford through the dérive technique and her use of found images. Dixon argues that, like the riot itself,

Oldfield Ford's work exposes what is hidden by the veneer of respectability ... [it shows] just how thin that veneer is, how beneath the fake harmony of consumerism and happy lives there is a "truth" of hardship, decay, and violence that will, on occasion, reveal itself. It is ... observed not easily, but by durational engagement with places, both in the form of the drifts and "off-site" in the forming of the juxtapositions of images and text that most accurately represent the potential of a place to experience civil unrest.

She describes her practise as centring on walks through London and the creation of "emotional maps". Ford has said "I regard my work as diaristic; the city can be read as a palimpsest, of layers of erasure and overwriting. The need to document the transient and ephemeral nature of the city is becoming increasingly urgent as the process of enclosure and privatisation continues apace." Discussing Alpha/Isis/Eden in 2018, she said "I walk around London to gauge what's happening, to tune into the affective shifts. This is how I think about walking and memory, as a process of piecing fragments together to resurrect something, to stop them being erased, and to will something into being." She also said, in the same interview:

Streets are indelibly marked by moments of socio-political intensity – uprisings, occupations and raves, trauma, anxiety and militancy – as well as the tremors and faultlines of your own past. The purpose of my walks is to identify something lingering, fizzing in the present. I'm not thinking about memory as a sanitised image, but as a texture in the moment, the sense that a place is crackling with agency. For me, this spectrality allows for a revisiting and reactivating of emancipatory currents.

While Ford's work has been described as psychogeography, Mark Fisher suggested that it be understood instead in terms of Jacques Derrida's account of hauntology, in order to better understand the ways the urban spaces she depicts represent "ghosts" or political paths not taken. Christopher Collier, conversely, has proposed that Ford's work be understood as both hauntology and psychogeography, and that such an approach allows a reappraisal of the politics of psychogeography. Collier argues that "Savage Messiah is psychogeographical in that it involves drifting through the city, exploring the effects of the environment upon behaviour and emotion", but also draws on hauntology as a means of engaging "the failures of social democracy and post-war Modernist urban planning, but also ... the collapse of the psychogeographic revival" of the 1990s.

=== Other work ===
Ford's work subsequent to Savage Messiah tends to move beyond the zines' focus on London and beyond the zine from, concerning other geographical spaces and adopting other forms including paintings and installations. Her work was also featured in Urban Constellations, a 2011 collection edited by Matthew Gandy. As of 2019 Ford was writing fiction and collaborating with the musician Jam City on work continuing the themes of the Savage Messiah project.
