= Piero Simondo =

Italian artist (1928–2020)

Piero Simondo (25 August 1928 – 6 November 2020) was an Italian artist born in Cosio di Arroscia, Liguria, Italy.

== Biography ==
In Alba, Piedmont, Italy, with Asger Jorn and Giuseppe Pinot Gallizio he founded the Laboratory of immaginiste experiences as part of the International Movement for an Imaginist Bauhaus (IMIB).

He edited Eristica the magazine published by IMIB and September 1956 he organised the First World-wide Conference of the Free Artists, with Jorn, Gallizio and Elena Verrone. He married Verrone two years later. At the Cultural Union of Turin he helped put on a demonstration unitary urbanism in December 1956.

In the summer of 1957 he took a holiday in his house in Cosio d' Arroscia. Here, with Michèle Bernstein, Guy Debord, Pinot Gallizio, Asger Jorn, Walter Olmo, Ralph Rumney and Elena Verrone the Situationist International was founded on 28 July. Following a row with Debord, he left the organisation with Olmo and Verrone.

In 1962 he founded in Turin the CIRA (International Center for an Institute of Artistic Research) with the purpose to expand the proposals of the Alba Laboratory.

From 1968 he continued with his own artistic activity.

From 1972 to 1996 Simondo worked at the University of Turin where he organised experimental activities at the Institute of Pedagogy. He held the chair of Methodology and Didactics of the Audovisual Medium .

Publications by Simondo include:

- Ars vetus, ars modernorum, SEI, Turin 1971
- What were the experiences of the Alba Laboratory, Libreria Editrice Sileno, Opuscola, Genoa 1986
- The Laboratory as Situation, Tirrenia Stampatori, Turin 1987
- The colour of colours, La Nuova Italia, Florence 1990
- Jorn in Italy. The Years of the imaginiste Bauhaus, F.lli Pozzo editori, Turin 1997
