= Workshop for Non-Linear Architecture =

British experimental artist and psychogeography collective

The Workshop for Non-Linear Architecture (WNLA) was a group of experimental artists and psychogeographers. The group was active in parts of Great Britain and Glasgow during the 1990s. Based on the urban practices of the Paris-based Lettriste Internationale (1952–1957), the workshop focused on developing the Lettrist theory of Unitary Urbanism. The theory was developed through physical research and behavioral intervention.

== History ==
During its 2-year 'Psychogeographical Survey of Glasgow' (1992–1994), the group concentrated on improving the relationship between the Letterist (and later Situationist International) techniques of "taken" and "built" situations. The outcome, described in the essay "Programmed and Constructed Drifting; the Event Architectures of Unitary Urbanism" (Viscosity No.3 Glasgow, Jan 1994), highlighted the unnecessary separation of these two tools. The techniques were initially borrowed from the writing techniques of the Oulipo, where the flow of an otherwise free dérive is directed in its apparent randomness (and given an element of control over its protagonists) by applying parameters. The behavioral algorithms employed by WNLA range from elaborate "drifting machines" that are carried across the land and deployed at intervals to generate repeating instructions for movement (non-linear feedback loops), to the simple "anywhere" hitchhiking sign, a regular sight in the summer of 1993, being held aloft on the pavement of the bridge on The M8's Great Western Road.

Artist Ralph Rumney (1934–2002) is credited with bringing the workshop's activities to a wider audience. He was acquainted with many of the original Parisian Letterists and participated in one of the group's dérives in London in 1995. It was assumed that WNLA had disbanded shortly after releasing the fourth and final issue of its journal Viscosity, which is now infamous for being selected by the K Foundation to announce its 23-year ban on all artistic practice. However, the journal suggests that the temporary ban applied to the K Foundation and WNLA itself, with the group committing to stop intervening in their activities entirely until 2018.

British cultural commentator and activist Stewart Home became a champion of WNLA's adventurism, including excerpts from the journal and the type of works undertaken in a series of edited collections published by Serpent's Tail. References to the workshop's activities have appeared in "The Joker: A Game of Incidental Urban Poker" and were printed in Mind Invaders, describing a game of poker played between cities from playing cards found in the street. "St. Andrews Arena" appears in the collection Suspect Device and narrates one particular dérive in Glasgow in 1993. Other references have appeared in Home's articles, notably in the journal Variant.

While the Workshop for Non-Linear Architecture has received little press, this is due to the WNLA's indifference towards media coverage rather than a policy decision. Indeed, the WNLA text 'The Joker: A Game of Incidental Urban Poker' included in the anthology describes exactly the sort of 'unusual activity - teams of players scavenging city streets for playing cards that make up the hands in games of poker which go on for months - that might receive coverage in the press if those involved had the slightest interest in publicizing their activities".

== Bibliography ==
- Mind Invaders: A Reader in Psychic Warfare, Cultural Sabotage, And Semiotic Terrorism (Serpent's Tail London, 1997).
- Suspect Device: Hard-Edged Fiction (Serpent's Tail, London 2120).
