= Notre-Dame Affair =

1950 French political incident

The Notre-Dame Affair was an action performed by Michel Mourre, Serge Berna, Ghislain Desnoyers de Marbaix, and Jean Rullier, members of the radical wing of the Lettrist movement, on Easter Sunday, 9 April 1950, at Notre-Dame Cathedral in Paris, while the mass was aired live on national TV. Mourre, dressed in the habit of a Dominican friar and backed by his co-conspirators, chose a quiet moment in the Easter High Mass to climb to the rostrum and declaim before the whole congregation a blasphemous anti-sermon on the death of God, penned by Berna.

== The Mourre-Berna Proclamation ==
Aujourd'hui, jour de Pâques en l'Année sainte,
Ici, dans l'insigne Basilique de Notre-Dame de Paris,
J'accuse l'Église Catholique Universelle du détournement mortel de nos forces vives en faveur d'un ciel vide;
J'accuse l'Église Catholique d'escroquerie;
J'accuse l'Église Catholique d'infecter le monde de sa morale mortuaire,
d'être le chancre de l'Occident décomposé.
En vérité je vous le dis : Dieu est mort.
Nous vomissons la fadeur agonisante de vos prières,
car vos prières ont grassement fumé les champs de bataille de notre Europe.
Allez dans le désert tragique et exaltant d'une terre où Dieu est mort
et brassez à nouveau cette terre de vos mains nues,
de vos mains d'orgueil,
de vos mains sans prière.
Aujourd'hui, jour de Pâques en l'Année sainte,
Ici, dans l'insigne Basilique de Notre-Dame de France,
nous clamons la mort du Christ-Dieu pour qu'enfin vive l'Homme.

Translation:

Today, Easter day of the Holy Year,
Here, under the emblem of Notre-Dame of Paris,
I accuse the universal Catholic Church of the lethal diversion of our living strength toward an empty heaven,
I accuse the Catholic Church of swindling,
I accuse the Catholic Church of infecting the world with its funereal morality,
Of being the running sore on the decomposed body of the West.
Verily I say unto you: God is dead,
We vomit the agonizing insipidity of your prayers,
For your prayers have been the greasy smoke over the battlefields of our Europe.
Go forth then into the tragic and exalting desert of a world where God is dead,
And till this earth anew with your bare hands,
With your proud hands,
With your unpraying hands.
Today Easter day of the Holy Year,
Here under the emblem of Notre-Dame of Paris,
We proclaim the death of the Christ-god, so that Man may live at last.

== The aftermath ==
The action and the events leading up to and following it are described in detail in Michel Mourre's autobiography. The authors of the action, young bohemians tied to Lettrism, an avant-garde movement surrounding Isidore Isou, were all arrested by the police. A furious mob chased the protesters from the church. The only one held for any length of time was Mourre, himself a former Dominican friar and the instigator of the whole affair. As his fate was being decided, dozens of prominent voices from culture, the church and the state joined a debate in the newspapers on the merits or (more commonly) not, of the provocation.

In particular Combat, an organ of the French Resistance, began with a commentary by its editor Louis Pauwels condemning the action; but a vehement letter in response by André Breton, attacking Pauwels for his "partial account," and defending the actions, escalated the debate; to it were devoted eight days of coverage and a running editorial forum amounting to a total of twenty-some articles by such figures as Jean Paulhan, Pierre Emmanuel, Maurice Nadeau, Messieur the Police Commissioner, le curé de Saint-Pierre de Chaillot, Gabriel Marcel, Benjamin Péret, and René Char.

The police and the Church, unable to let the insult pass unpunished, nevertheless wanted to avoid amplifying it through a public trial. After a few days they brought in a psychiatrist of questionable integrity, who recommended locking Mourre away in an asylum. Participants in the Combat debate, attentive to the case, protested, and upon the intervention of a second psychiatrist, Mourre was released on 21 April.

The scandal resonated into the heart of the Lettrist movement. Consistent with practices of agitation on which Isou had founded his movement in 1945, the Notre-Dame affair nevertheless put Isou's radicality, and that of his supporters, to the test. The action thus advanced a nascent rupture in the movement, between two blocs which could be called, respectively, "artistic" and "actionist," a rupture which two years later would lead to a schism and formation of the Lettrist International. It was after Gil J. Wolman, Jean-Louis Brau, and Guy Debord, the principal agents of this schism, joined the Lettrist movement, siding with the actionist Ultra-Lettrist bloc still distinguished by the Notre-Dame Affair, and who, along with Ivan Chtcheglov and Berna, formed the LI. It was the LI, launched on the occasion of an intervention directed against Charlie Chaplin, that between 1952 and 1957 experimented with new forms of art and action that would lead to the Situationist International.

The contributors to the Combat debate sought to diminish the importance of the Notre-Dame action by pointing out that it was not entirely without precedent, as, on 22 March 1892, young Blanquistes had interrupted mass, shouting "Long live the Republic! Long live the Commune! Down with the Church!"
