= Google Maps Road Trip =

2009 film

- Produced by: Marc Horowitz; Peter Baldes
- Release date: 2009
- Country: United States

Google Maps Road Trip was a live-streaming documentary produced by Marc Horowitz and Peter Baldes between August 10 and August 18, 2009. The event represented the first virtual live-streaming broadcast cross-country road trip: using only Google Maps, the pair drove from Los Angeles to Richmond, Virginia. They were interviewed by NPR Weekend Edition for their innovative "vacation". They were also mentioned in The New York Times, India's The Economic Times, The Faster Times and Readymade Magazine's blog. They streamed live on ustream.tv.

Google Maps Road Trip was part of the 6th annual Conflux festival in 2009 held at New York University in the Steinhardt School of Culture, Education, and Human Development as part of Psy-Geo-Conflux.
