= Gil J. Wolman =

French artist

Gil J. Wolman (photo intentionally adapted)

Gil Joseph Wolman (7 September 1929, Paris – 3 July 1995, Paris) was a French artist. His work encompassed painting, poetry and film-making. He was a member of Isidore Isou's avant garde Letterist movement in the early 1950s, then becoming a central figure in the Letterist International, the group which would subsequently develop (without Wolman himself) into the Situationist International.

== Lettrism ==
Wolman joined the Letterists in 1950, although he quit the group only two years later. His first published work appeared in the 1950 first issue of their journal Ur, where his 'Introduction to Wolman' would set the scene for later creations: "In the beginning, there was Wolman"! While still in the group, Wolman would make two major contributions. First, in sound poetry, he devised the notion of the 'megapneume': while lettrism was based upon the letter, megapneumes were based upon the breath. Second, in film, he produced L'Anticoncept, the work for which he is now primarily remembered. The film was shown for the first time on 11 February 1952 at the 'Avant-Garde 52' cinema club. It consisted of blank illumination projected onto a weather balloon, accompanied by a staccato spoken soundtrack. The film was banned by the French censors on 2 April 1952—when the Letterists visited the Cannes Film Festival the following month, they were forced to restrict the audience to journalists only. The text of the soundtrack was published in the sole issue of the Letterist journal Ion (1952; reprinted Jean-Paul Rocher, 1999), and later reissued in a separate edition augmented with associated texts (Editions Allia, 1994). Ion also included the text of Guy Debord's film Howls for Sade, which was dedicated to Wolman and featured his voice in its own soundtrack.

== First Letterist International ==
In June 1952, Wolman and Debord formed the Letterist International, which, with Jean-Louis Brau and Serge Berna, would officially split from the main group that December. Wolman contributed several texts to the Letterist International's own bulletin, Potlatch; and, with Debord, he co-authored some of its most important texts, published in the Belgian surrealist review Les Lèvres Nues (Naked Lips). These included 'A User's Guide to Détournement' and 'Theory of the Dérive' (both 1956). The term détournement (literally 'diversion') signified the deliberate re-use of plagiarised material for a new and usually subversive purpose. The dérive ('drift') was a process of aimlessly wandering through urban environments in order to map their psychogeography.

In 1955, Wolman wrote "Why Lettrism?", also with Guy Debord, published in Potlatch no. 22. The following year, he represented the Letterist International at the World Congress of Artists in Alba, Italy. This conference established important links between the Letterist International and those figures (primarily Asger Jorn and Pinot-Gallizio of the International Movement for an Imaginist Bauhaus) who would soon afterwards be joining forces with it to form the Situationist International. Wolman himself, however, never made it as far as the Situationist International. He was officially excluded from the Letterist International on 13 January 1957, just six months before the creation of the new group, the exclusion being announced in obituary format in Potlatch no. 28. Debord seems to have been the driving force behind the exclusion, which did cause some consternation among his colleagues. Even Michèle Bernstein, Debord's wife at the time, has stated that she did not understand why Debord took so suddenly against Wolman. Jean-Michel Mension, an early member of the Letterist International, recalls that "Gil was reticent, sweet—an incredibly sweet guy. I don't think I ever heard him actually raise his voice, except occasionally, except when he was reciting his poetry, but that was different. Everyone loved Gil." He also could not understand why Debord had excluded him, and observed: "I think Wolman, in Guy's eyes, was a truly extraordinary artist, clearly superior to the other artists in the Letterist International. Personally, I've never believed in the exclusion of Gil.". Ralph Rumney, an early member of the Situationist International, speculated that the real reason behind the exclusion was that Wolman and his wife, Violette, had just had a child: "Guy, and Michèle for that matter, had an absolute horror of domesticity and babies in particular. They were trying to experiment with new ways of living, which for Guy meant total sexual freedom. Wolman's happy family life could not be tolerated."

== Back with the Lettrists / Second Letterist International ==
Following his exclusion, Wolman continued to develop his own work, and he re-established links with the original Letterist movement and exhibited with them from 1961 to 1964. He devised Scotch Art in 1963, a process which consists in tearing off bands of printed matter and using adhesive tape to reposition them on fabrics or wood. In 1964, however, he split again from Isou's group, to establish the short-lived Second Letterist International with Jean-Louis Brau and François Dufrêne; thereafter, Wolman worked largely in isolation. He later developed the "separatist movement", and series of "dühring dühring", "decompositions" and finally "depicted painting".

== Posterity ==
Three years after his death, the magazine "Poézi Prolétèr" (No.2), directed by Katalin Molnar and Christophe Tarkos, published in 1998 an article on Wolman including several of his texts gathered under the title "Introduction of the word". Although at times often seen as a side-kick of Guy Debord, he is now regarded, along with Robert Filliou, as one of the more influential artists of his day. Wolman, however, who started a decade before Filliou, did not subscribe to Filliou's "genius without talent", but rather said that "genius is what we all have when we stop improving one thing in order to make something else. When we only refuse to have talent" (1964).

Several of Wolman's audio recordings were published through Henri Chopin's journal, OU; and an l.p., L'Anticoncept, was issued in 1999 by Alga Marghen, which gathered together various sound works from 1951 to 1972. A volume of his uncollected writings was published in 2001 by Editions Allia, Défense de mourir. The first international retrospective of Wolman's works was held at MACBA (Barcelona, 2010) and Museu SERRALVES (Porto, 2011), curated by Frédéric Acquaviva, Bartomeu Mari and Joao Fernandes, with a catalogue "Gil J Wolman, I am immortal and alive" in 3 different versions : English, Spanish-Catalan, French-Portuguese. The Centre Pompidou in Paris devoted a room to Wolman's works in 2015 while La Plaque Tournante, an independent art space in Berlin, programmed the first Wolman Retrospective in Germany with 500 works and documents.
