= Glowlab =

- Established: 2002
- Founder: Christina Ray
- Purpose: Artist collective
- Location: New York City, New York, United States
- Fields: The arts
- Official language: English
- Website: glowlab.com

Glowlab was an artist collective devoted to psychogeography and the experience of urban space. It was founded in 2002 by the artist and curator Christina Ray, and gathered a loose group of artists, writers, and technologists whose work reworked the maps and drifts of the Situationist International using mobile phones, Wi-Fi, and GPS—an approach associated with the locative media art that emerged in New York in the early 2000s. The collective is best known for co-founding the annual Psy-Geo-Conflux festival in 2003.

== History ==
Christina Ray launched Glowlab in 2002 as a web-based arts lab to support the visibility and work of artists in her community. The collective organized exhibitions, walks, and site-specific interventions, initially around Ray's Williamsburg loft and in the wider city. In 2008 Glowlab opened an exhibition space at the edge of SoHo, and over its run it produced more than a dozen solo and group exhibitions, artist talks, and performances. In early 2010, Ray relaunched the project under her own name, continuing to focus on contemporary art, technology, and the psychology of the built environment.

== Conflux festival ==
In 2003, Ray and David Mandl, of the Brooklyn Psychogeographical Association, co-founded the Psy-Geo-Conflux, later known as the Conflux Festival, an annual New York gathering devoted to psychogeography. The Village Voice described Conflux as a "network of maverick artists and unorthodox urban investigators … making fresh, if underground, contributions to pedestrian life in New York City, and upping the ante on today's fight for the soul of high-density metropolises."

== Projects ==
Beyond the festival, Glowlab initiated several projects exploring public space. One Block Radius (2004), produced for the New Museum by Ray and Mandl, was a web-based "psychogeographic portrait of a single Bowery block" assembled with media contributions from artists and the public. Open Lab, at Art Interactive in Cambridge, Massachusetts, was a nine-week series of "deceptively simple, playful investigations of site and the social fabric of Central Square." At Southern Exposure in San Francisco, Ray and Kurt Bigenho's project Noso invited people to step away from internet social-networking sites such as Myspace and Friendster and meet in real space.

== Associated artists ==
Artists and groups associated with Glowlab include Wilfried Hou Je Bek, Bethany Bristow, Kate Armstrong, D. Jean Hester, Brian House, Emily Conrad, Catherine D'Ignazio (also known as Kanarinka), Steve Lambert, David Mandl, Ryota Matsumoto, Roberto Mollá, Marisa Olson, Mark Price, Sal Randolph, Jesse Shapins, Swoon, Holly Tavel, Jessica Thompson, Lee Walton, and the Wooster Collective.
