= Werner Rosenberg =

German-born French photographer and photojournalist known as Véro (1913-1988)

Werner Rosenberg (1913-1988) known as Véro, was a German-born French photographer and photojournalist.

== Biography ==
Werner Rosenberg was a Jewish German. From the age of fifteen he became a passionate devotee of photography.

In 1933, he went to Paris, though his parents refused to accompany him. There he made his living from photography, producing portraits and industrial photographs, and contributing to Vu magazine (1928-1940), under the pseudonym 'Véro'. He was made a naturalized French citizen in 1939.

== War years ==
During WW2 and the German occupation of France he joined the Catholic resistance movement Compagnons de France (the 'Companions of France') and assumed the identity 'Michel Thibault' to protect himself. Denounced in 1943, he was forced to hide in the countryside around Isère.

After the war, he returned to live with his family in Paris as a freelance photographer, providing illustrations and reports for the Catholic press.

In 1955 his softly backlit photograph of a woman and children dancing in a ring under a glade of saplings in late afternoon light was selected by Edward Steichen for the world-touring exhibition The Family of Man that he curated for the Museum of Modern Art, and that was seen by 9 million visitors.

== Rediscovery ==
Rosenberg's reluctance to publicise his work has meant that since the 1960s he has been largely overlooked, despite his considerable output, and the consistent quality of his street photography especially. It was not until 1999, when a monograph published by Editions Didier Richard 200 clichés pour un nouveau millénaire ('Two Hundred Photographs for a New Millennium') was posthumously released by Rosenberg's son Christophe, that the photographer 'Véro' once more came to attention. Journalist Éric Merlen wrote its introduction. The two hundred monochrome photographs, made in the genre of Humanist photography, show rural and urban life in France from 1945 to 1970, many taken in Isère.

== Publication ==
Rosenberg, W. A., & Merlen, E. (1999). 200 clichés pour un nouveau millénaire. Claix: Editions Didier Richard.
