= Psychogeography =

Creative view of the built environment that emphasizes playfulness and dérive

Psychogeography is the exploration of urban environments that emphasizes interpersonal connections to places and arbitrary routes. It was developed by members of the Letterist International and Situationist International, which were revolutionary groups influenced by Marxist and anarchist theory as well as the attitudes and methods of Dadaists and Surrealists.

In 1955, Guy Debord defined psychogeography as "the study of the precise laws and specific effects of the geographical environment, consciously organized or not, on the emotions and behavior of individuals." The key tactic for exploring psychogeography is the loosely defined urban walking practice known as the dérive. As a practice and theory, psychogeography has influenced a broad set of cultural actors, including artists, activists and academics.

== Development ==
Psychogeography was originally developed by the Lettrist International 'around the summer of 1953'. Debord describes psychogeography as 'charmingly vague' and emphasises the importance of practice in psychogeographical explorations. The first published discussion of psychogeography was in the Lettrist journal Potlatch (1954), which included a 'Psychogeographical Game of the Week':

Depending on what you are after, choose an area, a more or less populous city, a more or less lively street. Build a house. Furnish it. Make the most of its decoration and surroundings. Choose the season and the time. Gather together the right people, the best records and drinks. Lighting and conversation must, of course, be appropriate, along with the weather and your memories. If your calculations are correct, you should find the outcome satisfying. (Please inform the editors of the results.)

The Lettrists' reimagining of the city has its precursors in aspects of Dadaism and Surrealism. The concept of the flâneur is also cited as an influence on the development of psychogeography.^{:3;}^{18} Widely credited to Charles Baudelaire, who was influenced by Edgar Allan Poe's "The Man of the Crowd", it was further developed theoretically by Walter Benjamin.

Ivan Chtcheglov, in his 1953 essay "Formulaire pour un urbanisme nouveau" ("Formulary for a New Urbanism"), established many of the concepts that would inform the development of psychogeography. Forwarding a theory of unitary urbanism, Chtcheglov wrote "Architecture is the simplest means of articulating time and space, of modulating reality, of engendering dreams". Similarly, the Situationists found contemporary architecture both physically and ideologically restrictive, combining with outside cultural influence, effectively creating an undertow, and forcing oneself into a certain system of interaction with their environment: "[C]ities have a psychogeographical relief, with constant currents, fixed points and vortexes which strongly discourage entry into or exit from certain zones". Following Chtcheglov's exclusion from the Lettrists in 1954, Guy Debord and others worked to clarify the concept of unitary urbanism, in a bid to demand a revolutionary approach to architecture.

At a conference in Cosio di Arroscia, Italy in 1956, the Lettrists joined the International Movement for an Imaginist Bauhaus to set a proper definition for the idea announced by Gil J. Wolman: "Unitary Urbanism - the synthesis of art and technology that we call for — must be constructed according to certain new values of life, values which now need to be distinguished and disseminated."

Eventually, Debord and Asger Jorn resigned themselves to the fate of "urban relativity". Debord readily admits in his 1961 film A Critique of Separation, "The sectors of a city…are decipherable, but the personal meaning they have for us is incommunicable, as is the secrecy of private life in general, regarding which we possess nothing but pitiful documents". Despite the ambiguity of the theory, Debord committed himself firmly to its practical basis in reality, even as he later confesses, "none of this is very clear. It is a completely typical drunken monologue…with its vain phrases that do not await response and its overbearing explanations. And its silences." "This apparently serious term 'psychogeography'", writes Debord biographer Vincent Kaufman, "comprises an art of conversation and drunkenness, and everything leads us to believe that Debord excelled at both."^{:114}

Before settling on the impossibility of true psychogeography, Debord made another film, On the Passage of a Few Persons Through a Rather Brief Unity of Time (1959). Among the rants which construct the film (regarding art, ignorance, consumerism, militarism) is a desperate call for psychogeographic action:

When freedom is practised in a closed circle, it fades into a dream, becomes a mere image of itself. The ambiance of play is by nature unstable. At any moment, "ordinary life" may prevail once again. The geographical limitation of play is even more striking than its temporal limitation. Every game takes place within the boundaries of its own spatial domain.

Moments later, Debord elaborates on the important goals of unitary urbanism in contemporary society:

The atmosphere of a few places gave us a few intimations of the future powers of an architecture that it would be necessary to create in order to provide the setting for less mediocre games.

Giving a quote that he attributed to Karl Marx, Debord says:

People can see nothing around them that is not their own image; everything speaks to them of themselves. Their very landscape is animated. Obstacles were everywhere. And they were all interrelated, maintaining a unified reign of poverty.

== Dérive ==
Along with détournement, one of the main Situationist practices is the dérive (French: [de.ʁiv], "drift"). The dérive is a method of drifting through space to explore how the city is constructed, as well as how it makes us feel. Guy Debord defined the dérive as "a mode of experimental behavior linked to the conditions of urban society: a technique of rapid passage through varied ambiances." He gave a fuller explanation in "Theory of the Dérive" (1956), first written as a member of the Letterist International:

In a dérive one or more persons during a certain period drop their usual motives for movement and action, their relations, their work and leisure activities, and let themselves be drawn by the attractions of the terrain and the encounters they find there… But the dérive includes both this letting go and its necessary contradiction: the domination of psychogeographical variations by the knowledge and calculation of their possibilities.

The dérive's goals include studying the terrain of the city (psychogeography) and emotional disorientation, both of which lead to the potential creation of Situations.

== Contemporary psychogeography ==
Since the 1990s, as situationist theory became popular in artistic and academic circles, avant-garde, neoist, and revolutionary groups emerged, developing psychogeographical praxis in various ways. Influenced primarily through the re-emergence of the London Psychogeographical Association and the foundation of The Workshop for Non-Linear Architecture, these groups have assisted in the development of a contemporary psychogeography. Between 1992 and 1996 The Workshop for Non-Linear Architecture undertook an extensive programme of practical research into classic (situationist) psychogeography in both Glasgow and London. The discoveries made during this period, documented in the group's journal Viscosity, expanded the terrain of the psychogeographic into that of urban design and architectural performance. Morag Rose has identified three dominant strands in contemporary psychogeography: literary, activist and creative.^{:29}

In the early 2000s, psychogeography was taken up by artists working with mobile and location-aware technologies, a tendency that became known as locative media art. Since 2003 in the United States, separate events known as Provflux and Psy-Geo-conflux have been dedicated to action-based participatory experiments, under the academic umbrella of psychogeography. An article on the second annual Psy-Geo-conflux described psychogeography as "a slightly stuffy term that's been applied to a whole toy box full of playful, inventive strategies for exploring cities." Psychogeography has also made a methodological appearance in Library and Information Science.

Psychogeography also became a device used in literature. In Britain in particular, psychogeography has become a recognised descriptive term used in discussion of successful writers such as Iain Sinclair and Peter Ackroyd. Sinclair is '[a]rguably the most high-profile British psychogeographer' and is credited with having a strong influence on the term's greater public use in the United Kingdom.^{:9} Though Sinclair makes infrequent use of the jargon associated with the Situationists, he has certainly popularized the term by producing a large body of work based on pedestrian exploration of the urban and suburban landscape. Scholar Duncan Hay asserts that Sinclair's work does not represent the utopian and revolutionary foundations of Situationist practice, and instead 'finds its expression as a literary mode, a position that would have appeared paradoxical to its original practitioners'.^{:3} Sinclair has distanced himself from the term, declaring it a 'very nasty set of branding'.^{:19} Will Self also contributed to the popularisation of the term in Great Britain through a column in the Saturday magazine of the national broadsheet The Independent.^{:11;} The column, which started out in the British Airways inflight magazine, ran in The Independent until October 2008.

Sinclair and similar thinkers draw on a longstanding British literary tradition of the exploration of urban landscapes, predating the Situationists, found in the work of writers William Blake, Arthur Machen, and Thomas de Quincey. The nature and history of London were a central focus of these writers, utilising romantic, gothic, and occult ideas to describe and transform the city. Sinclair drew on this tradition combined with his own explorations as a way of criticising modern developments of urban space in the key text Lights Out for the Territory. Peter Ackroyd's bestselling London: A Biography was partially based on similar sources. Merlin Coverley gives prominence to this literary tradition in his book Psychogeography (2006). Coverley recognises the situationist origins of psychogeographic practice are sometimes overshadowed by literary traditions, but that they had a shared tradition through writers like Edgar Allan Poe, Daniel Defoe, and Charles Baudelaire.

The documentaries of filmmaker Patrick Keiller are also considered to be an example of psychogeography.

Aleksandar Janicijevic, the initiator of the Urban Squares Initiative, defined psychogeography for the group in the following terms: "The subjective analysis–mental reaction, to neighbourhood behaviours related to geographic location. A chronological process based on the order of appearance of observed topics, with the time delayed inclusion of other relevant instances". In 2013 Aleksandar Janicijevic published "Urbis – Language of the urban fabric" as a visual attempt to rediscover lost or neglected urban symbols. In 2015 another book was published, "MyPsychogeography", an attempt to synthesize sketches and ideas which have informed his art practice.

The 2019 video game Disco Elysium draws heavily on psychogeography to tell its story, particularly through the "Shivers" skill. "Shivers" allows the main character Harry du Bois to commune directly with the fictional city of Revachol, ascribing to it a persona and a consciousness and a memory. The socio-political dynamics of the city, and the player's engagement with them, directly affect Du Bois' identity, as well as the progress of the game. The game engages widely with political ideology, and it uses psychogeography particularly to engage with Marxist and anarchist themes.

== Groups involved in psychogeography ==
Psychogeography is practiced both experimentally and formally in groups or associations, which sometimes consist of just one member. Known groups, some of whom are still operating, include:

- Glowlab
- Loiterers Resistance Movement
- London Psychogeographical Association
- Nottingham Psychogeographical Unit
- Providence Initiative for Psychogeographic Studies
- The Workshop for Non-Linear Architecture
- The Jejune Institute

== Noted psychogeographers ==
- Peter Ackroyd
- Michèle Bernstein
- Pat Barker
- Paul Conneally
- Guy Debord
- Stewart Home
- Jacqueline de Jong
- Duke London
- Robert Macfarlane
- Geoff Nicholson
- Iain Sinclair
- Laura Oldfield Ford
- Nick Papadimitriou
- Will Self
- Cathy Turner (artist)
- Jean Rolin
- Philippe Vasset

== Applications for mobile devices ==
A number of applications have been made for mobile devices to facilitate dérives:

- Dérive app
- Serendipitor
- Drift
- Dérive

== See also ==
- Desire path
- Ecocriticism
- Edgelands
- Environmental psychology
- Flâneur
- Graffiti
- Hypergraphy
- Landscape zodiac
- Parkour
- Psychohistory
- Psychonaut
- Rhizome (philosophy)
- Social trail
- Urban exploration
- Wayfinding
- Earth Mysteries
- Walking
