= Walter Olmo =

Italian musician and composer (1938–2019)

Walter Olmo (28 November 1938, Alba, Piedmont, Italy – 16 May 2019) was an Italian musician and composer. In 1957 he wrote Towards a Conception of Musical Experimentation (Pour un concept d'expérimentation musicale). He advocated avant-garde electronic and contemporary music. In his 1975 he published the essay La fine della preistoria musicale (The End of Musical Prehistory).

He attended the Milan Conservatory graduating in piano and composition. He then studied under Mauricio Kagel, Karlheinz Stockhausen, Christian Wolff and Iannis Xenakis in Darmstadt. Then he moved to Accademia Musicale Chigiana, Siena where he studied with Franco Donatoni and Franco Ferrara.

With Piero Simondo, Elena Verrone, Michèle Bernstein, Guy Debord, Giuseppe Pinot-Gallizio and Asger Jorn, Olmo founded the Situationist International on July 28, 1957. Following a row with Debord, the Italian Section consisting of Olmo, Simondo and Verrone was expelled in January 1958. However he continued to collaborate with Gallizio, providing his "tereminofono", a musical instrument he had devised by adapting a theremin, for Gallizio's first public exhibition of "Industrial Painting" held at the Notizie Gallery, Turin on 30 May 1958.

During the 1980s, he was a lecturer at the Licinio Refice Conservatory Frosinone.
