= Nottingham Psychogeographical Unit =

The Nottingham Psychogeographical Unit was founded in Nottingham, England, in 1994, by Onesto Lusso, Minky Harry and Dade Fasic. It produced videos, writings and mental maps based on psychogeography. It moved to London in 1998.

In 2002, the unit was quoted in a Guardian article that "there are already too many buildings" and that all new developments should stop immediately. Recent new buildings should be torn down according to popular demand from local residents, they were quoted as saying, and "citizens should be given total administrative power over development".
