= Olivier Meyer =

French photographer (born 1957)

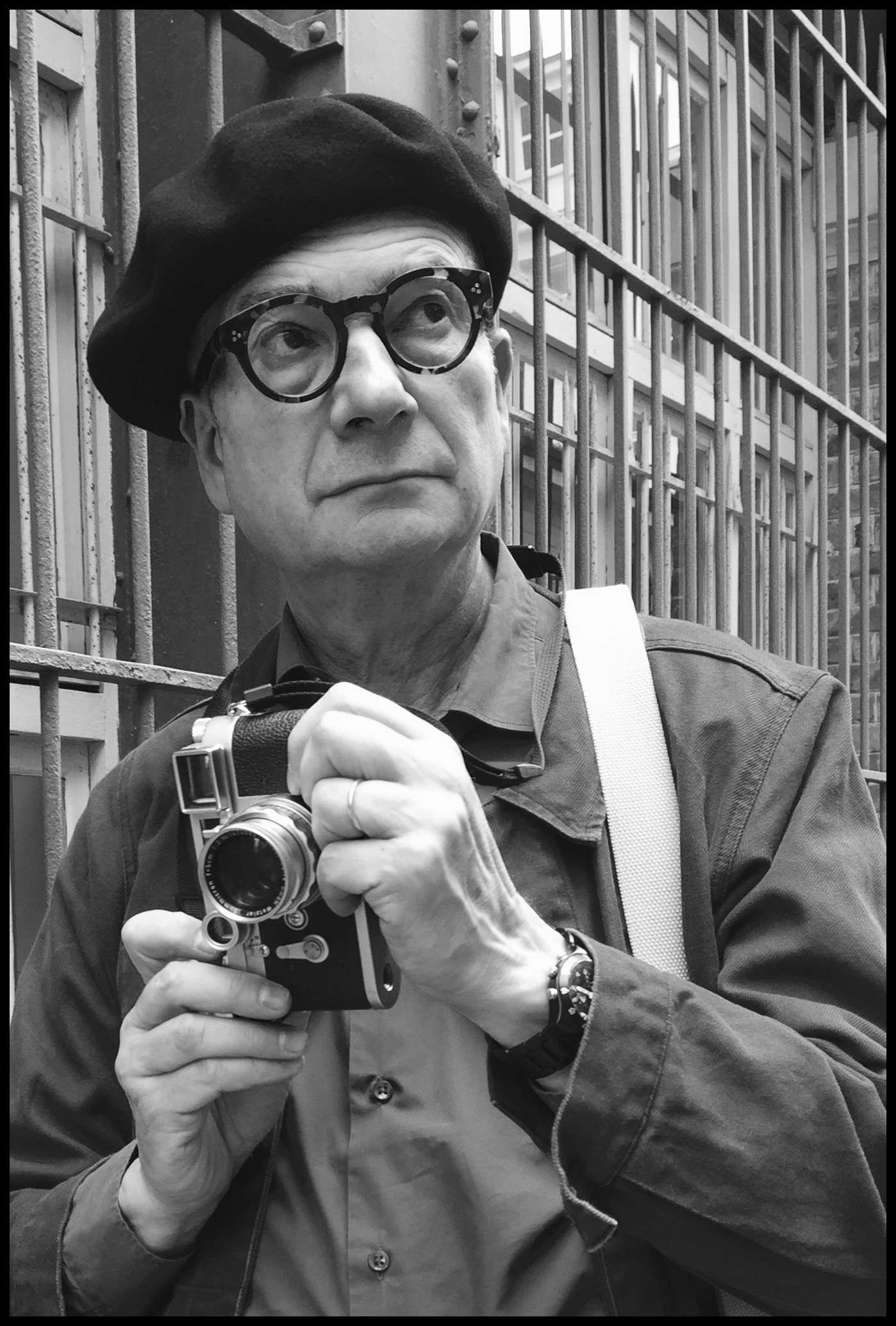
- Olivier Meyer by Alexandra Meyer in 2017
- Born: August 22, 1957
- Occupation: Photographer

Olivier Meyer is a French photographer born in 1957. He lives and works in Paris, France.

== Biography ==
His photo-journalism was first published in France-Soir Magazine and subsequently in the daily France Soir in 1981. Starting from 1989, a selection of his black and white photographs of Paris were produced as postcards by Éditions Marion Valentine.

He often met the photographer Édouard Boubat on the île Saint-Louis in Paris and at the Publimod laboratory in the rue du Roi de Sicile. Having seen his photographs, Boubat told him: "at the end of the day, we are all doing the same thing...". When featured in the magazine Le Monde 2 in 2007, his work was noticed by gallery owner Charles Zalber who exhibited his photographs at the gallery Photo4 managed by Victor Mendès.

== Work ==
His work is in the tradition of humanist photography and street photography using the same material as many of the forerunners of this style: Kodak Tri-X black and white film, silver bromide prints on baryta paper, Leica M3 or Leica M4 with a 50 or 90 mm lens. The thin black line surrounding the prints shows that the picture has not been cropped.

His inspiration came from Henri Cartier-Bresson, Édouard Boubat, Saul Leiter. His portrait of Aguigui Mouna sticking his tongue out like Albert Einstein, published in postcard form in 1988, and subsequently as an illustration, in a book by Anne Gallois served as a blueprint for a stencil work by the artist Jef Aérosol in 2006 subsequently reproduced in the book VIP. His photographs were exhibited at the Photo4 gallery in Paris in April 2008, and again in January 2010 together with photographs by Ralph Gibson.

In September 2012, the Dupif gallery in Paris held an exclusive exhibition of his work to mark the publication of the book Paris, Nothing new.

== Collections ==
- Musée juif de Belgique, Bruxelles, Belgium
- Musée de la photographie à Charleroi, Belgium

== Bibliography ==
- Olivier Meyer, Paris Nothing new, Éditions Letzalem, 2012. A book of black and white photographs of Paris, some recent, but with a choice of subjects and backgrounds which avoid any reference to the modern world, hence the subtitle Nothing new.
- Olivier Meyer, Kotel Beyond the wall, Éditions Letzalem, 2012. A collection of black and white photographs punctuated with questions about the Kotel also called the Western Wall, remnant of the Temple in Jerusalem. The subtitle Beyond the wall refers to the questions which evoke a spirituality capable of transcending a wall made of stones.
- Olivier Meyer, London Nothing new, Éditions Letzalem, 2015. A book of black and white photographs of London, foreword by the collector Alain Dercourt, interview of the photographer by Patricia Frischer, Founder and Coordinator of the San Diego Visual Art Network, California.
