= Maison de la photographie Robert Doisneau =

Photographic art museum in Gentilly, France

Coordinates: 48°48′51″N 2°20′51″E

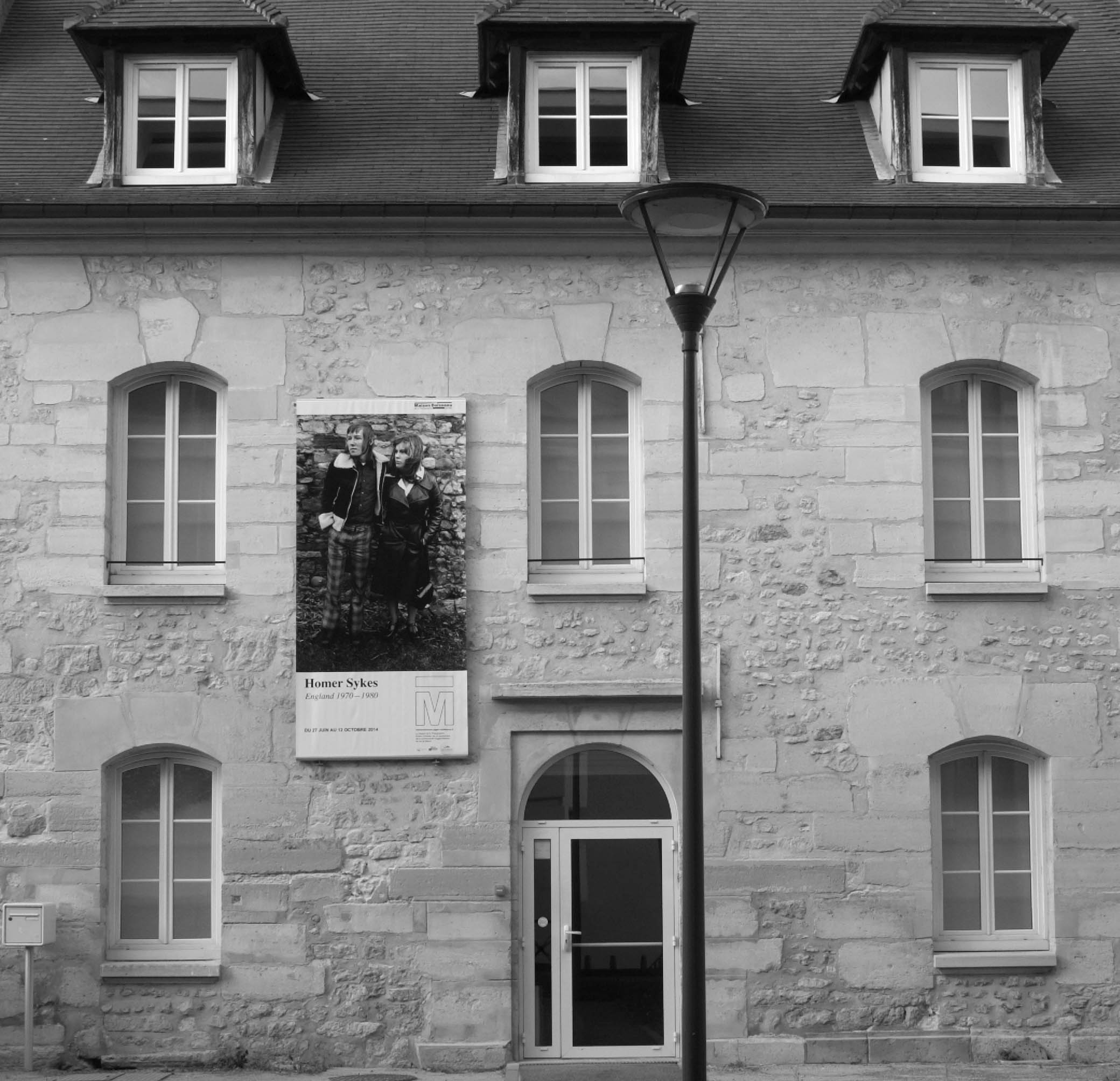
Maison de la photographie Robert Doisneau

The Maison de la photographie Robert Doisneau (Robert Doisneau house of photography) is a photography gallery in the Paris suburb of Gentilly, created to commemorate the Parisian photographer Robert Doisneau and dedicated to exhibiting humanist photography.

== Exhibits ==
Doisneau (1912–1994) was born in Gentilly, and in April 1992 consented to the use of his name for a photographic gallery there. The gallery opened in 1997 with a wide-ranging exhibition of the history of photography.

Among the photographers to have been awarded one-man shows at Maison Robert Doisneau are Graciela Iturbide (2006), Hervé Gloaguen (2006), Izis (on the occasion of the tenth anniversary of the gallery's founding, 2007), Nikos Economopoulos (2009–10). and Émile Savitry (2012/13).

From January 2006, the gallery has belonged to the intercommunality of Val de Bièvre.

The address of the gallery is 1, rue de la Division du Général Leclerc, 94250 Gentilly.

== See also ==
- List of museums devoted to one photographer
