= Ralph Rumney =

English artist

Ralph Rumney (5 June 1934 – 6 March 2002) was an English artist, born in Newcastle upon Tyne. At the age of 2 he moved with his family to Halifax where his father was an Anglican vicar.

Anti-Establishment from the start, he was called a pervert by the Bishop of Leeds for ordering the complete works of the Marquis de Sade while still a schoolboy. He attended boarding school, turned down a chance to attend Oxford, and dropped out of art school. He was expelled from the Young Communists for lack of moral rectitude.

A lifelong conscientious objector, Rumney evaded National Service by going on the run in continental Europe or, as he himself put it, "I took my passport and buggered off to Paris."

What followed and continued was a life as a nomad, wandering from country to country, into and out of trouble - in London, Paris, Milan, Venice, or on the tiny island of Linosa, south of Sicily, one of his favourite places.

Rumney was the founder (and only member) of the London Psychogeographical Association. This organization was, along with COBRA and the Lettrist International, involved in the formation of the Situationist International (SI). Amongst those present with Rumney at the founding in the Italian village of Cosio d'Arroscia in 1957 were Walter Olmo, Michèle Bernstein (later his second wife), Asger Jorn and Guy Debord. However, within seven months Rumney had been "amiably" expelled from the SI by Debord for "failing to hand in a psychogeography report about Venice on time."

This was primarily a project he conceived of a psychogeographic exploration of Venice which he called The Leaning Tower of Venice, one of the earliest experiences in the history of psychogeography. Rumney chose and followed an itinerary through the city and documented it photographically. He completed the project in 1959 and published extracts in ARK, the magazine of the Royal College of Arts. The full edition was finally published in a limited edition in 2002.

In 1957, Rumney met the art collector Peggy Guggenheim at a show of his work in London, which led to an introduction to her daughter Pegeen. He was so taken with her that he gave her his painting The Change which now hangs in the Tate Gallery collection and which Peggy had wanted to buy herself.

He moved, as his friend Guy Atkins said, "between penury and almost absurd affluence. One visited him in a squalid room in London's Neal Street, in a house shared with near down-and-outs. Next, one would find him in Harry's Bar in Venice, or at a Max Ernst opening in Paris.... He seemed to take poverty with more equanimity than riches."

An example of that was when "he jumped out of the taxi where Peggy Guggenheim was sitting to borrow the fare from Bernard Kops, who didn't have much, at his Charing Cross Road bookstall."

Throughout his peripatetic life Rumney painted, and between painting he adopted a series of other activities, including editing a short-lived journal of poetry and the arts; broadcasting an interview programme on French National Radio; and teaching art at the Canterbury College of Art. He also took an active part in developing events at the Institute of Contemporary Arts (ICA) in London.

As a prolific artist, Rumney "produced a vast body of work over the years - from informal abstracts to large canvases using gold and silver leaf, from plaster moulds to polaroids, montages and videos." According to David Wise, he was "an artist who tried to move beyond the boundaries of art; one encompassing a profounder social vision helping initiate psychogeography and the practise of the dérive."

After early solo shows in Trieste and Milan, and in Brussels together with Jorn, Rumney participated in the Paris Biennale and the ICA in London in 1959. From 1961 to 1967 his work was on show at Galleria Il Traghetto in Venice. Following his show Constats (1950-1988) at England & Co in London, The Change was acquired by the Tate; and some of his later works were seen at a further solo show at the same gallery in 1993. More recently there were retrospectives of his work at his home town of Halifax and, in 2010, at Galerie Lara Vincy in Paris.

As well as the Tate, Rumney's work is in public collections at The Hepworth Wakefield; and the University of Dundee which holds a collection of Rumney's works which the artist gifted to Alan Woods.

In the early 1970s, Rumney married Debord's former wife and fellow situationist Michèle Bernstein, and, though they later divorced, the two remained close friends. To Ralph, she was "the most situationist" of them all, the one who fought to stop the group turning into an ideology or a sect. In that case, they were perfectly matched.

Ralph Rumney died of cancer at his home in Manosque, Provence, France, in 2002, aged 67.
