= René Maltête =

French photographer and poet

- Born: 8 May 1930; Lamballe, Côtes-d'Armor, France
- Died: 28 November 2000 (aged 70); La Ferté-Villeneuil, Eure-et-Loir, France
- Known for: humor pictures
- Website: rene.maltete.com

René Maltête (1930–2000) was a French photographer and poet.

== Biography ==
René Maltête was born on 8 May 1930 at Lamballe (Côtes-d'Armor, France).

He started taking pictures at 16; his first camera was a Pontiac 6×9. (Note: For a description of the camera, see "Pontiac Bakélite".) In 1951 he went to Paris to become an assistant director.

Maltête wanted to be a film director but lacked a camera. In 1954 he bought a Semflex 6×6 still camera (Note: For a description of the camera, see "Semflex".) and started taking photographs seriously.

In 1958, he integrated the Rapho picture agency.

In 1960, his first book Paris des rues et des chansons was published, after many rejections by other prospective publishers. With text by Jacques Prévert, Boris Vian, Georges Brassens, Charles Trenet, and Pierre Mac Orlan, it came out in three editions, and 35,000 copies were sold.

Maltête captured amusing situations in everyday life. His pictures were published in numerous magazines worldwide (Asahi Camera, Camera, Epoca, Life, Look, Paris-Match, Popular Photography, Punch, Stern).

In 1973 Maltête moved to Dreux, where he and friends organized "Art en Dreux"; seven years later he would also found a poetry festival there.

In 1979 and 1980 Maltête was invited to the Rencontres d'Arles.

René Maltête died on 8 November 2000.

== Photographs ==
His pictures are based on incongruity and surprise: humor is always present, but more than just a picture, there is often a philosophical dimension.

Some of René Maltête's pictures

== Books ==
- Paris des rues et des chansons. Paris: Éditions Port-royal, 1960. Paris: Pierre Bordas, 1995. ISBN 2-86311-268-6.
- Au petit bonheur, la France. Paris: Hachette, 1965.
- Intervention à coeur ouvert : Petits poèmes. Paris: Éditions Grassin, 1962. Poems and photographs.
- Graines pour les sans jardin : Propos comme ça.... Éditions Firmin-Didot, 1980. ISBN 2-904540-00-8.
- Scribouillages. Plessier, 1985. Poems and photographs
- Cent poèmes pour la paix. Paris: Éditions Le Cherche Midi, 1987. ISBN 2-86274-106-X. (Preface by Bernard Clavel, cover by Roland Topor.)
- Cent poèmes pour l'écologie : Anthologie. Paris: Éditions Le Cherche Midi, 1991. ISBN 2-86274-193-0. (Preface by Hubert Reeves.)
- À quoi ça rime ? [Le Mans]: Éditions Donner à voir, 1995. ISBN 2-909640-10-8. Poems and photographs
- La barbe à papa : textes. Paris: Le Sémaphore, 1999. ISBN 2-912283-30-2. Maltête contributes the photographs to this book by José Millas-Martin.
- Des yeux plein les poches. Grenoble: Éditions Glénat, 2003. ISBN 2-7234-4248-9.
