= Jean-Michel Mension =

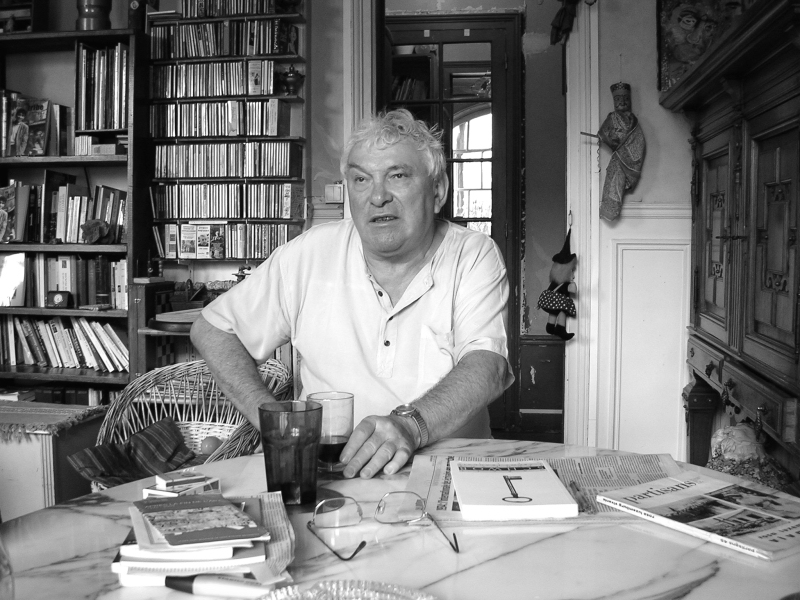
Jean-Michel Mension in 2004

Jean-Michel Mension (24 September 1934 – 6 May 2006) was a French radical active in the Lettrist International, from which he was expelled as "merely decorative", and the Ligue Communiste.

Mension was the son of Paris-born Communist Party activists who were active in the resistance during the Nazi occupation of Paris. Mension described the life of the Lettrist group and their associates in Saint-Germain-des-Prés, 1952–1954, in a book-length collection of conversations with Gerard Berreby and Francesco Milo, The Tribe. For a period, he was a close associate of Guy Debord, founder of the Lettrist International and later of the Situationist International, and wrote several texts for the Lettrist International journal Potlatch.

Mension appears in photographs taken by the Dutch photographer Ed van der Elsken and published in his book Een liefdesgeschiedenis in Saint Germain des Prés (1956): "(He) turned himself into a living poster and paraded through the streets of Saint-Germain-des-Prés with cryptic slogans scrawled up and down his pants...A few days later, Mension and Fred got drunk, streaked their hair with peroxide, and stumbled through the quarter slapping female shoppers and picking fights with businessmen." Some commentators have detected a prototype of punk outrage in Mension's style and behavior.
