= Psy-Geo-Conflux =

Festival dedicated to unplanned urban exploration of New York City

Psy-Geo-Conflux (better known as Conflux) was an annual New York City festival dedicated to psychogeography, where visual, audio, and performance artists, writers, urban adventurers, researchers and the public gather for four days to explore physical and psychological landscapes of the city. It has been on hiatus for over a decade.

Active from 2003 to 2010, the festival was a focal point for the locative media art that emerged in New York during the festival's operating years, presenting works that used mobile phones, wearable computers and GPS, alongside lower-technology psychogeographic experiments to explore the city.

== Founding ==
Conflux was co-founded by David Mandl of the Brooklyn Psychogeographical Association and Glowlab's Christina Ray. The first Psy-Geo-Conflux event was held in May 2003 at ABC No Rio in New York. Psychogeographers from the U.S., Canada, UK, France and the Netherlands conducted experimental walks using computer code, decks of cards and other systems for navigation; a mobile-phone-guided drift through the streets of New York, a life-sized chess game using humans as pieces, talks and presentations, a noise parade, an art exhibition, and a night of psychogeography-inspired live music, DJs, and video were on the event's schedule. Village Voice writer Bryan Zimmerman noted, "The event is centered around a seasoned yet growing field of creative recreation and alt-geographic exploration called psychogeography. Trying to define this obtuse field is an adventure itself, although a relatively straightforward definition includes "the study of the effects of the geographic environment on the emotions and behavior of individuals. One of the boldest characteristics of psychogeography may be its ability to influence and bring together all kinds of artists, social scientists, philosophers, urban provocateurs and spelunkers, and even traditional geographers, in an entirely accessible venue-public space."

== History ==
Conflux 2004 featured a full program of events over the course of four days, including experimental walks using altered maps, navigational aids, and wearable computing devices, a walking presentation of an urban documentary project commissioned by the New Museum of Contemporary Art, a gallery exhibition, a series of temporary installations, lectures, audio and video works and more occurred. The second annual event took place at PARTICIPANT INC non-profit arts center on the Lower East Side, and included over 50 participating international artists and groups.

In 2005, Conflux was replicated by Providence Initiative for Psychogeographic Studies in Providence, Rhode Island in an event known as Provflux. An additional Conflux-related event titled "Open Lab" was held at Art Interactive in Cambridge, Massachusetts. The 3rd annual Conflux festival was held in Brooklyn for the first time on September 14–17 2006. McCaig-Welles Gallery in Williamsburg served as Conflux headquarters, with events taking place in and around the gallery. The 4th annual festival was held at in Williamsburg, Brooklyn, the 5th annual festival at the Center for Architecture in lower Manhattan, the 6th annual festival at New York University in the Steinhardt School of Culture, Education, and Human Development on September 18-20th, and the 7th annual festival was held on October 8–10 at NYU Steinhardt's Barney Building, in 2010.

== Bibliography ==
- In Brooklyn, a Confluxion Junction by Martha Schwendener, New York Times, September 18, 2007
- Ambling Through the Psy.Geo.Conflux by Patrick Ellis, CIAC Magazine Special Issue: The Virtual City, Autumn, 2004.
- Adrift on Memory Bliss by Andrea Moed, Knowledge Circuit [University of Minnesota Design Institute], September 12, 2004.
- A New Way of Walking:Artist-explorers called psychogeographers are changing the way we experience the city by Joseph Hart, Utne magazine, July / August 2004
- PSY-GEO-CONFLUX by Alan Lockwood, New York Press [Vol 17 - Issue 19], May 12–18, 2004, p. 42.
- Psy.Geo.Conflux 2004, psicogeografia a New York, Neural.it, November 7, 2017.
- Three Days of Psychogeographic Heaven – An Overview of the PsyGeoConflux 2003 in NYC by Dave Mandl, Christina Ray, et al., Year Zero One Issue #12 [Psychogeography - Space, Place and Perception], Summer 2003.
- Kilgannon, Corey (May 12, 2003). "Street Artists, Fighting Over Gentrified Streets". The New York Times. p. 6.
