= Lee Walton =

American visual artist

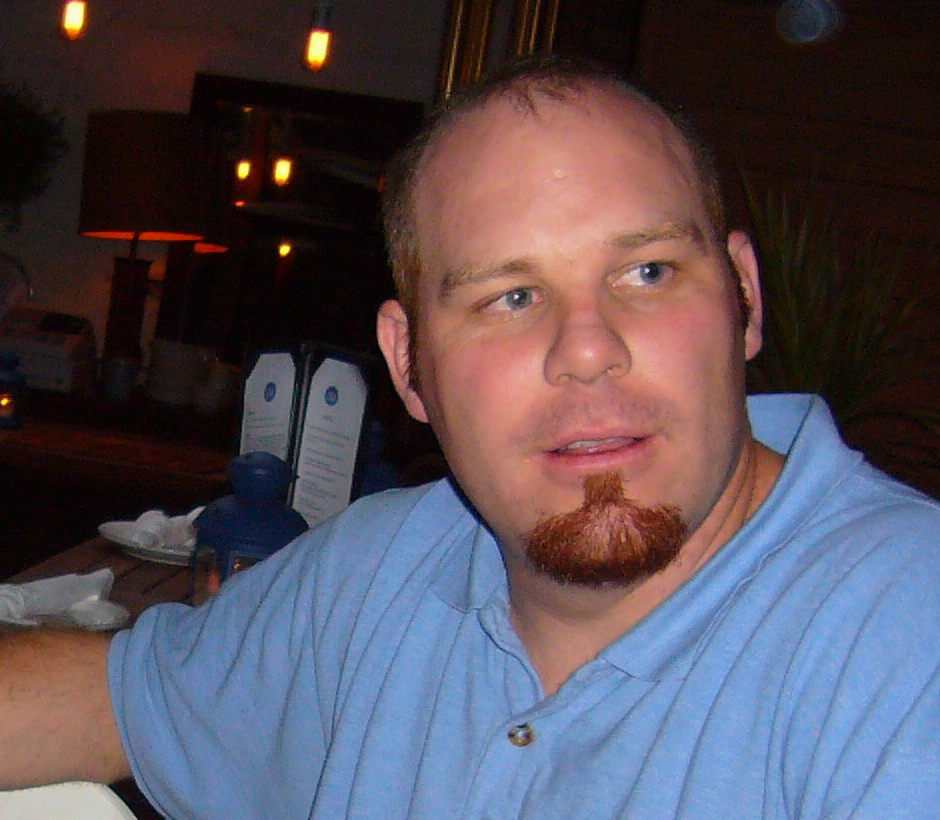
- Born: California
- Education: MFA, California College of Arts and Crafts. BFA, San Jose State University
- Known for: drawing, sculpture, video, performance, and New Media Art
- Movement: Social Practice

Lee Walton is an American visual artist whose artwork is regularly associated with the subject of sports. Walton has exhibited his work internationally in a variety of media including drawing, concept-based systems, performance art, video art, net art, and public projects. Several projects by Walton were included in the 2013 visual art exhibition Art of Sport at CEPA Gallery in Buffalo, New York.

== Academic career ==
Walton holds a Master of Fine Arts Degree from the California College of the Arts and a Bachelor of Fine Arts Degree from San Jose State University. He is a professor at University of North Carolina at Greensboro.

== Projects ==
Much of Walton's work involves sports. For example, in 2004 to 2005 Walton organized a free throw contest with basketball player Shaquille O'Neal; for every free throw by O'Neal, Walton attempted one, hoping to beat O'Neal's average.

"Stacked" took place in New York from May to September 2005, as part of the exhibition "Sport." Walton purchased 35-pound plates on the Upper East Side of Manhattan, then walked them to the Socrates Sculpture Park where he stacked them on a vertical metal pole.

== Performances ==
Produced in 2010, "The Rules for Staying Young" was a performance where Walton created a 3x6 module grid and created rules to the May 8, New York Mets vs San Francisco Giants baseball game. Walton viewed the game live from his home and via Skype watched as the installation crew added to the grid from the rules given to them by Walton. The Performance was shown from May 7–30 at New Wilmington Art Association in Delaware.

== Awards, honors, and commissions ==
- 2008 Commission, Jet Blue: Video Installation at JFK International Airport, Curated by Creative Time, New York, NY
- 2007 Commission, Rhizome at the New Museum of Contemporary Art, New York, NY
- 2005 New Commissions • Art in General New York, New York
- 2005 Performa commission, New York, New York
- 2004 Visiting Artist Project, Indianapolis Museum of Contemporary Art, Indianapolis, Indiana
