= Peter Cornelius (photographer) =

German photojournalist (1913–1970)

Peter Cornelius (1913–1970) was a German photographer and photojournalist.

== Biography ==
After World War II, Cornelius restarted his career in "reportage, landscape and sailing photography" in his hometown of Kiel. Beginning in 1956, he specialised in colour photography as one of the first color photographers in Germany. In 1960 he became known to a larger public through the special exhibition Magie der Farbe (Magic of Color) during the Photokina in Cologne. The other photographers exhibited were Walter Boje, Erwin Fieger and Heinz Hajek‐Halke. His best known work is a 1961 collection of color photographs of Paris, titled Farbiges Paris.

== Publications ==
- Farbiges Paris. Düsseldorf: Econ, 1961. With text by Jacques Prévert. (in German)
  - Couleur de Paris. Lausanne: Edita, 1961. (in French)
  - Paris in Colour. London: Thames & Hudson, 1962. (in English)
  - Paris i färg. Stockholm: Nordisk Rotogravyr, 1962. (in Swedish)
- Magie der Farbenphotographie. Düsseldorf: Econ, 1961. (in German)
- Magie de la photo en Couleur. Edita, Lausanne 1961 (french)
- Magic with the color camera. Thames & Hudson, London 1962 (English)
- Köln farbig photographiert. Cologne: Verkehrsamt der Stadt Köln (tourist office of Cologne), 1965. Photographs by Cornelius, Horst Baumann and Chargesheimer. Text in German, English, French, Portuguese, and Dutch.
- Farbenfrohes Kiel. Kiel: Mühlau, 1962. (in German)
- Farbiges Kiel. Kiel Presseamt (public relations office of Kiel), 1967. (in German)
- Olympia der Segler. Bielefeld: Delius Klasing, 1972. (in German)
- "Faszination" sailing calendar, Bielefeld: Delius Klasing, 1967–1971.
