= Michel Mourre =

French historian (1928–1977)

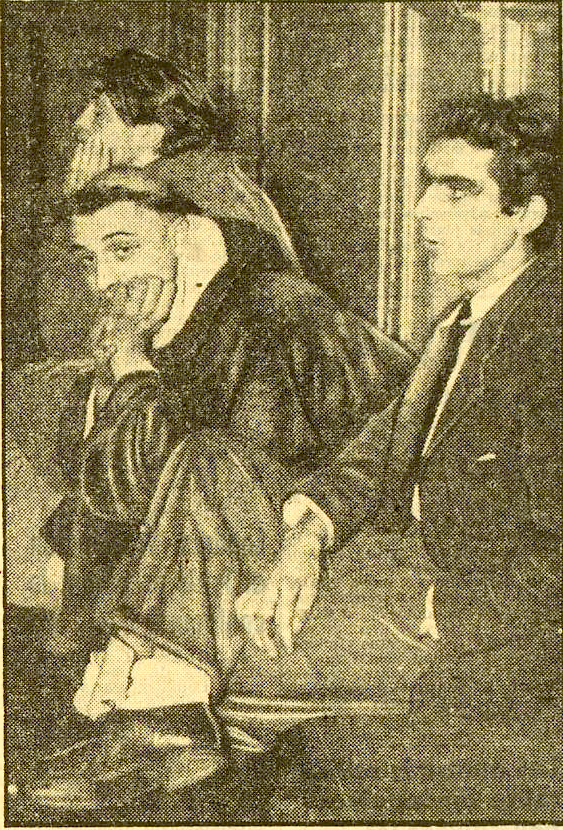
- Michel Mourre "as a Dominican," photograph published in Combat, April 12, 1950.
- Occupation: historian

Michel Mourre (born June 11, 1928, in Eaubonne (Val d'Oise) – August 6, 1977, in Fontenay-lès-Briis) was a historian and philosopher from France.

Michel Mourre, born in Eaubonne, was a solitary autodidact, highly erudite and demanding, who dedicated himself entirely to history. He was the only child of an architect and was raised in an atheist family spanning several generations. (Note: His paternal great-grandfather, the family’s official hero, had been a member of the Paris Commune.) Mourre lost his mother at the beginning of World War II, and his father abandoned him during the exodus.

After attending primary school, he studied at the Lycée Janson-de-Sailly, where Paul Guth was one of his teachers. After the Liberation, Mourre joined the Parti républicain de la liberté (PRL), resulting in his expulsion from the lycée. (Note: See the bio-bibliographic preface to his work Le Monde à la mort de Socrate, Hachette, 1971.) Alone in Paris, he supported himself while beginning to study the works of Nietzsche, Barrès, Bernanos, and Maurras, whose ideas led him to Catholicism.

In 1949, after a year of military service in Germany, Mourre had a disillusioning experience with the Dominican Order at Saint-Maximin in Provence. He later became involved in the avante garde Lettrism movement in Saint-Germain-des-Prés. He participated under the pseudonym Jacques Pathy in the "Grand Meeting des Ratés" on March 15, alongside Serge Berna, Jean-Louis Brau, and Gil Joseph Wolman,

On April 9, 1950, Mourre was implicated in the Notre-Dame scandal. In this event, four young Lettrists, Serge Berna, Ghislain Desnoyers de Marbaix, Jean Rullier, and Mourre, along with some accomplices, attended Easter mass at Notre-Dame Cathedral. Mourre, dressed as a monk, climbed into the pulpit and delivered an iconoclastic and blasphemous speech written by Serge Berna, infamous for the declaration: "God is dead [...] so that Man may live at last." The four were arrested, and the event caused a national and international scandal, leading Mourre to publish his autobiography, Malgré le blasphème, in 1951. In this work, he reflected on the intellectual, political, and religious debates of his generation.

Following his public contrition, Mourre began contributing regularly to Aspects de la France, the newspaper of the Action française movement. He later specialized in historical works.

Mourre subsequently undertook his magnum opus, the Dictionnaire d'histoire universelle, published in eight volumes between 1978 and 1982. His name became synonymous with this work, often referred to as the Encyclopédie Mourre or simply Le Mourre. The dictionary has since undergone numerous revised editions by Éditions Bordas.

In 1962, Mourre was awarded the Académie française's Max-Barthou Prize for his body of work.

== Publications ==
=== Books ===
- Malgré le blasphème, Éditions Julliard, Paris, 1951
- Charles Maurras, preface by Henry Bordeaux and Pierre Dominique, Maison d'édition universitaire, "Classiques du XX^{e} siècle," Paris, 1953
- Lamennais ou l'hérésie des temps modernes, Amiot-Dumont, Paris, 1955
- Le Monde à la mort de Socrate, foreword by Robert Flacelière, Club des amis du livre, Paris, 1961
- Les Religions et les philosophies d'Asie, Éditions de la Table ronde, Paris, 1961
- Le Monde à la naissance du Christ, foreword by Pierre Grimal, Hachette and Club des amis du livre, Paris, 1962
- Histoire vivante des moines. Des Pères du désert à Cluny, Éditions du Centurion, Paris, 1965
- Dictionnaire d'Histoire universelle, 2 vols., Éditions universitaires, Paris, 1968
- Vingt-cinq ans d'histoire universelle (1945-1969), Éditions universitaires, Paris, 1971
- Dictionnaire encyclopédique d'histoire, 8 vols., revised edition of Dictionnaire d'histoire universelle, Éditions Bordas, Paris, 1978-1982 (multiple reprints)
- Le Petit Mourre. Dictionnaire de l'Histoire, selected articles updated to January 1, 1990, edited by Philippe Doray, Éditions Bordas, Paris, 1993

Mourre also contributed to the Dictionnaire des œuvres, de tous les temps et de tous les pays, the Dictionnaire des auteurs, and the Dictionnaire des personnages, published by Robert Laffont in 1955, 1958, and 1960, respectively. He participated in the French edition of the collective work Le Socialisme: de la lutte des classes à l'État socialiste, Librairie universelle, 1975.

=== As editor ===
- Henri Massis, Barrès et nous, with previously unpublished correspondence between Maurice Barrès and Henri Massis, Plon, Paris, 1962
- Pierre de Boisdeffre (ed.), Gaston Bouthoul, Joseph Comblin, Didier-Jacques Duché, et al., Dictionnaire des idées contemporaines, Éditions universitaires, Paris, 1964

=== Bibliography ===
- Greil Marcus (1998). Lipstick Traces, Une histoire secrète du vingtième siècle. Paris: Éditions Allia. ISBN 979-10-304-0860-7.(Reissued in 2018)
