= Letterist International =

Parisian collective of radical artists and cultural theorists, precursor to Situationists

Letterist Internationational
- Internationale lettriste
- Abbreviation: I.L. LI
- Successor: Situationist International
- Formation: 7 December 1952
- Founder: Guy Debord; Gil J. Wolman; Serge Berna; Jean-Louis Brau
- Founded at: Aubervilliers
- Dissolved: 28 July 1957
- Key people: Gilles Ivain; Hadj Mohamed Dahou; Michèle Bernstein; Patrick Straram; Alexander Trocchi; Asger Jorn

The Letterist International (in French: L'Internationale lettriste, abbreviated I.L.) was a Paris-based collective of radical artists and cultural theorists between 1952 and 1957. It was created by Guy Debord and Gil J. Wolman rejoined by Jean-Louis Brau and Serge Berna as a schism from Isidore Isou's Lettrist group. The group went on to join others in forming the Situationist International, taking some key techniques and ideas with it.

"Letterist" (lettriste) was the form the group themselves used as in their 1955 sticker "If you believe you have genius, or if you think you have only a brilliant intelligence, write the letterist internationale". Although the spelling "Lettrist" is also common in English, authors and translators such as Donald Nicholson-Smith, Simon Ford, Sadie Plant, and Andrew Hussey use the "Letterist International" (LI) spelling.

The group was a motley assortment of novelists, sound poets, painters, film-makers, revolutionaries, bohemians, alcoholics, petty criminals, lunatics, under-age girls, and self-proclaimed failures. In the summer of 1953, their average age was a mere twenty years, rising to twenty nine and a half in 1957. In their blend of intellectualism, protest and hedonism—though differing in other ways, for instance in their total rejection of spirituality—they might be viewed as French counterparts of the American Beat Generation, particularly in the form it took during exactly the same period, i.e., before anyone from either group achieved notoriety, and were still having the adventures that would inform their later works and ideas.

== History and theory ==
The LI was the first breakaway faction from Isidore Isou's Letterists (they would be followed in turn by the Ultra-Letterists). The schism developed when the left wing of the Letterist group disrupted a Charlie Chaplin press conference for Limelight at the Hôtel Ritz Paris in October 1952. They distributed a polemic entitled "No More Flat Feet", which concluded: "The footlights have melted the make-up of the supposedly brilliant mime. All we can see now is a lugubrious and mercenary old man. Go home Mister Chaplin." Isou was keen to distance himself from his younger acolytes' tract. His own attitude was that Chaplin deserved respect as one of the great creators of the cinematic art. The breakaway group felt that he was no longer relevant, and they turned Isou's own words back against him: "We appreciated the importance of Chaplin's work in its own time, but we know that today novelty lies elsewhere, and 'truths which no longer entertain become lies' (Isou)." As they proceeded to explain, "the most urgent exercise of liberty is the destruction of idols".

Although the LI had in fact already been covertly formed by Guy Debord and Gil J. Wolman in June 1952, even before the Chaplin intervention and the public split from Isou, it was not formally established until 7 December 1952. The four signatories of the Chaplin tract (Debord and Wolman, together with Jean-Louis Brau and Serge Berna) agreed on a constitution for the group during a visit to Aubervilliers (where Brau's father lived). Anyone collaborating with 'Isouian activities', they declared, would be automatically excluded, even if this was being done in defence of the LI. 'It is in the transcendence of arts that everything has yet to be done.' The official base of the group was at 32, Rue de la Montagne-Sainte-Geneviéve, Paris, subsequently to become the official base of the Situationist International (but invariably referred to by both groups as "Rue de la Montagne-Geneviéve", signalling their disdain for religion). This was in fact the address of a bar, Tonneau d'Or, and indeed most of their time was spent either drinking in a number of bars in Saint-Germain-des-Prés, principally at Chez Moineau on the Rue du Four, or else simply walking the streets.

There was a serious purpose behind their ambulation. They developed the dérive, or drift, where they would wander like clouds through the urban environment for hours or sometimes even days on end. During their wanderings in the Summer of 1953, an "illiterate Kabyle" suggested to them the term "Psychogeography", to designate what they saw as a pattern of emotive force-fields that would permeate a city. The dérive would enable them to map out these forces, and these results could then be used as a basis upon which to build a system of unitary urbanism. Among their most important texts on these matters were Debord's "Theory of the Dérive" (published in the Belgian surrealist magazine Les Lèvres Nues, no. 9, November 1956), and Ivan Chtcheglov's "Formulary for a New Urbanism" (written October 1953, but not published until June 1958 in the first issue of the journal Internationale Situationniste). In the latter, Chtcheglov advocated a new city where, as he wrote, "each person will live in his own personal 'cathedral'. There will be rooms that produce dreams better than drugs, and houses where it will be impossible to do anything but love." He declared, "The Hacienda must be built", a remark which would later inspire the name of the famous Manchester night-club. In "Introduction to a Critique of Urban Geography" (Les Lèvres Nues, no. 6, September 1955), Debord described a colleague's drift through the Harz region of Germany, blindly following a map of London. This is still a favourite methodology amongst psychogeographers. They produced a broad range of proposals: the abolition of museums and the placing of art in bars, keeping the Metro open all night, opening the roofs of Paris like pavements with escalators to help gain access.

Another important notion developed by the LI was that of détournement, a technique of reutilising plagiarised material (literary, artistic, cinematic, etc.) for a new and usually radical purpose. The defining LI text here was the 1956 "A User's Guide to Détournement", by Debord and Wolman, from Les Lèvres Nues no. 8. They argued: "In truth, it is necessary to do away with the whole notion of personal property in this area. The emergence of new demands renders earlier 'great works' obsolete. They become obstacles, bad habits. It is not a question of whether we like them or not. We must pass them by." These techniques were subsequently used extensively by the Situationists. In addition, such characteristically situationist concepts as the construction of situations and the supersession of art were first developed by the LI.

In addition to the central Parisian group, an Algerian section of the LI was established in April 1953 by Hadj Mohamed Dahou, Cheik Ben Dhine and Ait Diafer. Based at Orléansville ('the most letterist city in the world' according to Potlatch no. 12), they were hit hard by an earthquake there on 9 September 1954, although initial reports that most of them had been killed turned out to be unfounded (Potlatch no. 13). A Swiss section was also established in late 1954, but were almost immediately excluded (Potlatch no. 15).

In September 1956, Wolman represented the LI at the World Congress of Artists in Alba, Italy. This conference had been organised by Asger Jorn and Pinot-Gallizio of the International Movement for an Imaginist Bauhaus (IMIB), and important links between the two groups were consolidated. Wolman himself was excluded from the LI shortly afterwards, but the remaining members, Debord and Michèle Bernstein, subsequently visited Cosio d'Arroscia where, on 28 July 1957, the LI officially fused with the IMIB and the London Psychogeographical Association to form the Situationist International.

== Adventures ==
Besides the Charlie Chaplin protest, some of the more noteworthy/startling activities of the LI include:

- Ivan Chtcheglov's plan to blow up the Eiffel Tower, on no other grounds than that its lights were shining through his bedroom window and keeping him awake at night.
- Debord's legendary 1953 graffito, "Ne travaillez jamais!" ("Never work!"), inscribed on a wall at the corner of the Rue de Mazarine and Rue de Seine. The slogan would later reappear in May 1968, and summed up the ethos of both the LI and the Situationist International after them.

Although pre-dating the formation of the LI (but directly involving Serge Berna, and inspiring the others), one might also mention:

- A 1950 letterist attempt at the "liberation" of a Catholic orphanage at Auteuil, causing a small-scale riot in protest at how "youth suffers in slavery, or is super-exploited by the seniority system."
- The Notre-Dame Affair of Easter Sunday, 1950, where Michel Mourre, dressed in a Dominican's habit, took to the pulpit and began to address the congregation, informing them, before anyone realised that anything was amiss, that God was dead, and that the Catholic Church was "appropriating our life force in the name of an empty heaven", and "infecting the world with its morality of death".

An extract from a letter of Gil Wolman to Jean-Louis Brau, of 20 July 1953, gives a clear impression of what the group and their associates tended to get up to from day to day:

I am back! ... Where were things when you left? Joël [Berlé] has been out for a long time, on probation. Jean-Michel [Mension] and Fred [Auguste Hommel] are now free, too (for stealing from parked cars—and under the influence, naturally). Little Eliane [Papaï] got out of police custody last week after a dramatic arrest in a maid's room somewhere in Vincennes with Joël and Jean-Michel; they were drunk, needless to say, and refused to open up to the police, who left and came back with reinforcements. In the confusion they lost the seal of the Letterist International. Linda [Fried] not sentenced yet. Sarah [Abouaf] still in the reformatory—but her sister, sixteen and a half, has taken her place. There have been other arrests, for narcotics, for who knows what else. It's getting very tiresome. There is G[uy]-E[rnest Debord], who has just spent ten days in a nursing home where his parents sent him following a failed attempt to gas himself. He's back in the neighbourhood now. Serge [Berna?] is due out on 12 May. The day before yesterday I threw up royally outside Moineau's. The latest diversion in the neighbourhood is spending the night in the Catacombs—another of Joël's bright ideas. I have a good many projects which are liable to remain just that—projects. ...

Decades later, Debord would nostalgically (though also somewhat ambiguously) sum up the spirit of the times in his Panegyric (1989): "Between the rue du Four and the rue de Buci, where our youth so completely went astray as a few glasses were drunk, one could feel certain that we would never do any better."

== Membership ==
- Guy Debord (1931–1994) (generally using the name 'Guy-Ernest' during this period).
- Gil J. Wolman (1929–1995). Excluded 1957.
- Michèle Bernstein (1932–). Joined 1954.
- Alexander Trocchi (1925–1984). Joined 1955.
- Hadj Mohamed Dahou (1926-2010) (aka Midhou or just Mohamed Dahou) Joined 1953.
- Ivan Chtcheglov (1933–1998) (known as "Gilles Ivain"). quit 1954.
- Serge Berna (1925?–?). Excluded 1953.
- Patrick Straram (1934–88). Joined 1953, quit 1954.
- Jean-Michel Mension. (1934–2006). Excluded 1954.
- Jean-Louis Brau (1930–1985) (known as "Bull Dog Brau"). Excluded 1953.

Several others also passed through the LI during its five years of existence, including André-Frank Conord, Jacques Fillon, Abdelhafid Khatib, Henry de Béarn and Gaëtan M. Langlais. In addition, the central members (almost all of them men), would sometimes include their girlfriends' names (usually first names only) among the signatories to their texts. Worthy of special mention among these girlfriends is Eliane Papaï (1935–?). An alumna of the same Auteuil orphanage the letterists had attempted to liberate, she was first the girlfriend of Debord, then the wife of Mension, and finally the wife of Brau. Debord recalled her fondly in many of his later films and writings, and she herself (as Eliane Brau) produced a book on the Situationists in 1968, Le situationnisme ou la nouvelle internationale. Jean-Louis Brau, Gil Wolman and François Dufrêne founded a Second Letterist International (D.I.L., Deuxième Internationale Lettriste) in 1964. The New Lettrist International was founded more recently and is independent of (though inspired by) the earlier group.

== Publications ==
The LI published four issues of the Internationale Lettriste bulletin between 1952 and 1954, followed by twenty eight issues of Potlatch from 1954 to 1957. A further two issues of Potlatch appeared in November 1957 and July 1959, now with the revised subtitle "Information bulletin of the Situationist International". Each issue comprised between one and four mimeographed sheets. Les Lèvres Nues, though not an LI publication, published some of their most important articles. All of these texts, together with a few other miscellaneous tracts, are reprinted in Documents Relatifs A La Fondation De L'Internationale Situationniste (Editions Allia, 1985).

Debord's 1959 collaboration with Asger Jorn, Mémoires, was directly concerned with the early days of the LI. The new Gallimard edition of his Oeuvres gathers many LI texts, including some never before published. Michèle Bernstein's novels, Tous les chevaux du roi (1960) and La Nuit (1961), present fictionalised accounts of her life with Debord during this period. Patrick Straram's Les bouteilles se couchent was a semi-fictionalised contemporary account of the scene, written in 1953 but lost until recently: it was published by Editions Allia in 2006. Also recently published by the same house are a biography of Ivan Chtcheglov and a separate collection of his writings. In October 2010, an unpublished text from the LI has just been released that recalls the adventures of the letterists between 1945 and February 1953 : Visages de l'avant-garde (Paris: Jean-Paul Rocher, éditeur, 2010).

Sources in English

- Mension, Jean-Michel. The Tribe (London: Verso, 2002). The most compendious source of information on the LI.
- Marcus, Greil. Lipstick Traces (London: Penguin, 1989).
- Home, Stewart. The Assault on Culture (Stirling: Ak Press, 1991).
- Hussey, Andrew. The Game of War (London: Jonathan Cape, 2001).
- van der Elsken, Ed. Love on the Left Bank (Stockport: Dewi Lewis Publishing, 1999). Ed van der Elsken was a Dutch photographer, who captured the scene around Moineau's during the period. Included among the people depicted in this book (first published 1956) are a few members and associates of the LI (particularly Mension and Papaï).
- Wark, Mckenzie. The Beach Beneath the Street: The Everyday Life and Glorious Times of the Situationist International. (New York: Verso, 2011)

Other sources

- Vachon, Marc L'arpenteur de la ville: L'utopie situationniste et Patrick Straram. (Les Éditions Triptyque, Montreal, 2003) ISBN 978-2-89031-476-4.

== See also ==
- Anti-art
