= Michèle Bernstein =

French writer (born 1932)

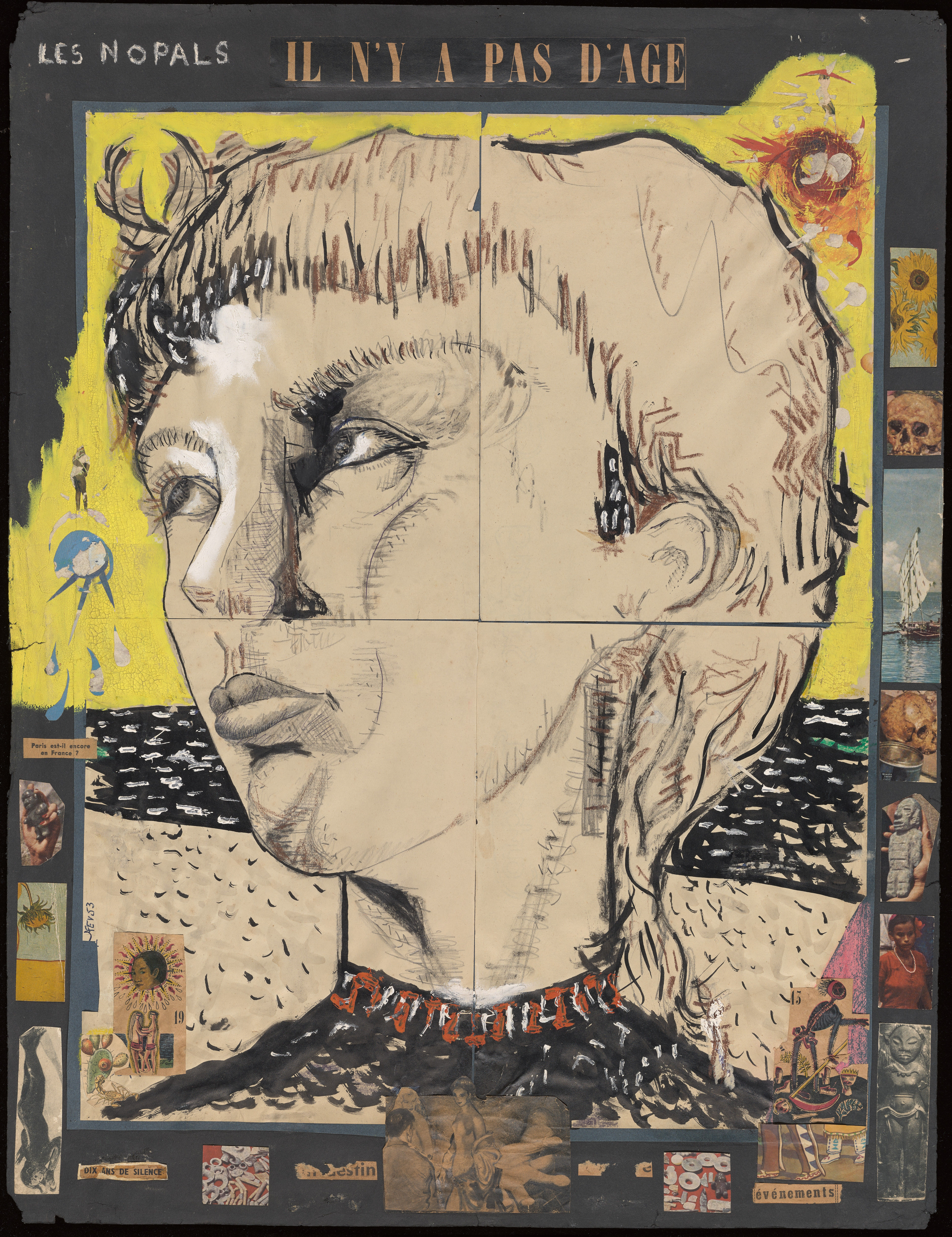
- Collage portrait of Michèle Bernstein by Ivan Chtcheglov, 1963
- Born: 28 April 1932 (age 94); Paris, France
- Occupation: Writer
- Organization: Situationist International
- Spouse: Guy Debord (m. 1954; div. 1972)

Michèle Bernstein (born 28 April 1932) is a French novelist and critic, most often remembered as a member of the Situationist International from its foundation in 1957 until 1967, and as the first wife of its most prominent member, Guy Debord.

== Life ==
=== Early years ===
Bernstein was born in Paris, of Russian Jewish descent. In 1952, bored by her studies at the nearby Sorbonne, she began to frequent Chez Moineau, a bar at 22 rue du Four. There she encountered a circle of artists, writers, vagabonds and petty criminals who were beginning to establish themselves as the Letterist International. With one of these, Patrick Straram, she toured Le Havre in August 1952, in order to see the places upon which Jean-Paul Sartre's Nausea had been modelled. On 17 August 1954, she married another member of the group, Guy Debord, and took a more active role in contributing to its publications (primarily its bulletin, Potlatch). Bernstein recalls that Debord had earlier tried to pick her up in a café in front of the Sorbonne, but that she had shaken her cigarette and said something disparaging. However, they first became friends, and then lovers: 'I did love him, and I am sorry he is not here with us now'.

=== From the Letterist to the Situationist movement ===
The Letterist International were primarily concerned with (i) transcending traditional artistic activities to produce 'situations' for themselves; (ii) to drifting aimlessly around urban environments in order to assess their psychogeography; and (iii) to diverting pre-existing texts and other materials to new ends. By 1957, however, most of the members of the Letterist International had either quit or been forcibly excluded, and the remnants opted to fuse with two other groups to form the Situationist International. Bernstein and Debord visited Cosio di Arroscia in July 1957: the Situationist International officially came into being there on 28 July. The other two groups involved were the International Movement for an Imaginist Bauhaus and the London Psychogeographical Committee. The former was an offshoot of the earlier CoBrA group of artists; the latter was not really a 'group' at all, but merely a name given to a single British artist, Ralph Rumney.

Thereafter, Bernstein contributed a number of articles to the situationists' journal, Internationale situationniste, either alone or in collaboration with the other members. In the journal's first issue, Bernstein wrote an essay entitled "No Useless Leniency" ("Pas d'indulgences inutiles") in which she argues for the complicated necessity of splits and schisms within the Situationist International. "It is necessary to recognize when an encounter in a concrete collective task becomes impossible," at which point the collective must be dissolved or reorganize. The radical political work of the International, Bernstein argues, "should not be subject to the same weaknesses" and "modes of continuity or looseness" as friendship, despite the unavoidable friendships that develop within the group. In her estimation, personal relationships must always remain secondary to the larger Situationist effort.

Bernstein published two détourned novels through Buchet/Chastel, whose moderate success helped her convince her publisher to publish Debord's major theoretical text, The Society of the Spectacle (1967), despite its non-commercial nature. In All The King's Horses (Tous les chevaux du roi, 1960; republished Paris: Allia, 2004) and The Night (La Nuit, 1961; republished by Allia in 2013), Bernstein tells the same story in two different ways, adapting the plot of Les Liaisons dangereuses to create a 'roman à clef despite itself' featuring characters based on herself, Debord and his lover Michèle Mochot. All The Kings Horses deliberately mimics the style popularized by Françoise Sagan in her novel Bonjour Tristesse (1954), which scandalized France when it was awarded the Prix des Critiques. The Night détourns the avant-garde nouveau-roman style of Alain Robbe-Grillet. Bernstein claims the novels were written as a joke, solely to make money at a time when she and her husband 'were rather skint.' All the King's Horses has been translated into English by John Kelsey (Semiotext(e)/Native Agents, 2008) The Night has been translated into English by Clodagh Kinsella (Book Works, 2013).

She also contributed an article on the situationists to the Times Literary Supplement (2 September 1964). According to the French philosopher and occasional associate of the Situationist International, Henri Lefebvre, she supported the Situationists financially, by writing horses' horoscopes for racing magazines. Though Bernstein did work a variety of jobs (including in advertising) to support herself and Debord, she has claimed the comment about writing horses' horoscopes was a joke.

During the first ten years of its existence, the Situationists continued the work of the Letterist International, and extended them in new directions. Feeling that they had already adequately transcended art, the group began to take on much more of a socio-political character, as they sought to realise their philosophy. Their greatest moment came in the uprising of May 1968, which they might not have caused but which they certainly encouraged. Bernstein herself, however, had officially retired from the group the previous year. Her marriage to Debord had broken down as he became close to Alice Becker-Ho. The marriage was officially dissolved on 5 January 1972, and he proceeded to marry Alice on 5 August.

=== The English years ===
A few years later, Bernstein happened to encounter Ralph Rumney. Rumney, notwithstanding his presence at the foundation of the Situationist International, had been excluded after only about nine months. They had not seen one another for some twenty years, but they fell in together again and got married. Rumney later speculated that her primary reason for marrying him was to get British citizenship. In any case, they seemed happy together, and remained close, just as Bernstein did with Debord himself even after the split. She settled in Salisbury, England, and, from 1982, she worked as a literary critic for the French journal, Libération. Rumney offers the following observation about Bernstein:

To me, she is the most Situationist of all. She was the one in Cosio who picked everyone up on the fact that one does not say "Situationism" but "Situationist", because when it becomes an "-ism" chances are that it will turn into an ideology, a sect. She would surely deny this, but I had the impression that she had a certain authority over Guy. She used it sparingly, but at the right moments. She knew how to rein him in when he slipped into the worst kind of exaggerations. Between Guy and Michèle there was a serious, lasting complicity when they were together, and even afterwards.
