= Ivan Chtcheglov =

Ivan Vladimirovitch Chtcheglov (Russian: Ива́н Влади́мирович Щегло́в; 16 January 1933 – 21 April 1998) was a French philosopher, political activist, and poet of Russian origin, best known as the ideologist of Unitary Urbanism and the author of the "Formulary for a New Urbanism", published under the pseudonym Gilles Ivain in 1953.

== Biography ==
=== Family background ===
Ivan was the son of Vladimir Chtcheglov, a revolutionary sentenced to two years imprisonment following the 1905 Revolution. After his release, Vladimir left the Russian Empire with his wife Hélene Zavadsky. After originally staying in Belgium for three years, the couple moved to Paris in 1910, where Vladimir continued work as a taxi driver. He was active in the CGT and involved in the 1911 drivers strike.

=== Activities ===
Ivan wrote Formulaire pour un urbanisme nouveau (Formulary for a New Urbanism) in 1953, at age nineteen under the name Gilles Ivain, which was an inspiration to the Lettrist International and Situationist International. The following quotation from the text was used as the inspiration for the famous Manchester nightclub, the Haçienda:

"And you, forgotten, your memories ravaged by all the consternations of two hemispheres, stranded in the Red Cellars of Pali-Kao, without music and without geography, no longer setting out for the hacienda where the roots think of the child and where the wine is finished off with fables from an old almanac. That’s all over. You’ll never see the hacienda. It doesn’t exist.

The hacienda must be built."

He and his friend Henry de Béarn planned to blow up the Eiffel Tower with some dynamite they had stolen from a nearby building site, because "its reflected light shone into their shared attic room and kept them awake at night." He was arrested at Les Cinq Billards on Rue Mouffetard in Paris and committed to a mental hospital by his wife, where he was subdued with insulin and shock therapy, and remained for 5 years. He died in 1998.
