= Members of the Situationist International =

List of people that, at different times, have been members of the Situationist International:

== Algerian Section ==
- Hadj Mohamed Dahou
- Abdelhafid Khatib

== American Section ==
- Robert Chasse
- Bruce Elwell
- Jan Horelick
- Tony Verlaan

== Belgian Section ==
- Walter Korun
- Attila Kotányi
- Rudi Renson
- Jan Strijbosch
- Raoul Vaneigem
- Maurice Wyckaert

== Dutch Section ==
- Anton Alberts
- Armando
- Constant
- Jacqueline de Jong
- Har Oudejans

== English Section ==
- Timothy (T. J.) Clark
- Chris Gray (1942–2009)
- Donald Nicholson-Smith
- Charles Radcliffe
- Ralph Rumney (1934–2002)

== French Section ==
- Francois de Beaulieu
- Michele Bernstein
- Patrick Cheval
- Alain Chevalier
- Guy Debord (1931 - 1994)
- Edith Frey
- Theo Frey
- Jean Garnault
- Anton Hartstein
- Herbert Holl
- Mustapha Khayati
- Ndjangani Lungela
- Rene Riesel
- Christian Sebastiani
- Patrick Straram
- René Viénet

== German Section ==
=== The SPUR Group ===
- Erwin Eisch
- Heinz Hofl
- Renee Nele
- Gretel Stadler

==== Excluded in February 1962 ====
- Lothar Fischer
- Dieter Kunzelmann
- Heimrad Prem
- Helmut Sturm
- Hans-Peter Zimmer

==== Not excluded in February 1962 ====
- Uwe Lausen

=== Non Spur members ===
- Hans Platschek

== Italian Section ==
- Giors Melanotte
- Walter Olmo
- Claudio Pavan
- Giuseppe Pinot-Gallizio
- Eduardo Rothe
- Paolo Salvadori
- Gianfranco Sanguinetti
- Piero Simondo
- Elena Verrone
- Glauco Wuerich

== Scandinavian Section ==
- Ansgar Elde
- Asger Jorn (1914–1973)
- Stefan Larsson
- Peter Laugesen
- Katja Lindell
- Jeppesen Victor Martin
- Jørgen Nash
- Hardy Strid

== No Section ==
- Ivan Chtcheglov
- Andre Frankin
- Jacques Ovadia
- Alexander Trocchi
