= Unitary urbanism =

Critique of built environment studies advanced by the Letterists

Unitary urbanism (UU) was the critique of status quo "urbanism", employed by the Letterist International and then further developed by the Situationist International between 1953 and 1960.

The praxis originates from the Lettrist technique of hypergraphics which was applied to architecture by the Lettrist International (LI). The UU critique of urbanism was further developed in the 1950s by the LI, and consists of a range of practices that include, but are not limited to:

- Situation
- Dérive
- Psychogeography
- Détournement
- Industrial painting
- Revolution

The critical practice continued to be developed by the Situationists and others. It was largely abandoned for the Debordian theory of the spectacle after the Second Situationist International and Situationist Antinational were formed. One of the few groups openly practicing unitary urbanism today is evoL PsychogeogrAphix in London.

Unitary urbanism was announced as a very specific praxis at the Alba platform between the Lettrist International and the International Movement for an Imaginist Bauhaus. In his Address to the Alba Conference in September 1956, the Lettrist International Delegate Gil J. Wolman said: "A unitary urbanism—the synthesis of art and technology that we call for—must be constructed according to certain new values of life, values which now need to be distinguished and disseminated." This mode of urban practice was also called for in a tract distributed during a demonstration by Lettrists in Turin, Italy in December 1956.

Constant Nieuwenhuys and Guy Debord disagreed about the praxis: Nieuwenhuys focused on structure, while Debord on content. Together, they issued the designation "the complex, ongoing activity which consciously recreates man's environment according to the most advanced conceptions in every domain". The disagreement led to Nieuwenhuys' split from the SI in 1960.

Unitary urbanism, one of the major early Situationist concerns, stands on two tenets:

- The rejection of the Euclidean, overly functional, urban architectural design, and
- The rejection of the detachment of art from its surroundings.

In the UU ideal, structural and artistic elements of humanity's metropolitan surroundings are blended into such grey area that one cannot identify where function ends and play begins. The resulting society, while it caters to fundamental needs, does so in an atmosphere of continual exploration, leisure, and stimulating ambiance.

== Unitary urbanists ==
- Piero Simondo
- Providence Initiative for Psychogeographic Studies
- Psy-Geo-Conflux
- The Workshop for Non-Linear Architecture

== Quotes ==
Whatever prestige the bourgeoisie may today be willing to grant to fragmentary or deliberately retrograde artistic tentatives, creation can now be nothing less than a synthesis aiming at the construction of entire atmospheres and styles of life. ... A unitary urbanism—the synthesis we call for, incorporating arts and technologies—must be created in accordance with new values of life, values which we now need to distinguish and disseminate.

— George Williams, La plate-forme d’Alba; originally appeared in Potlatch: Information Bulletin of the Lettrist International #27 (Paris, 2 November 1956), quoting Gil J Wolman.
