= Gruppe SPUR =

Group of German painters

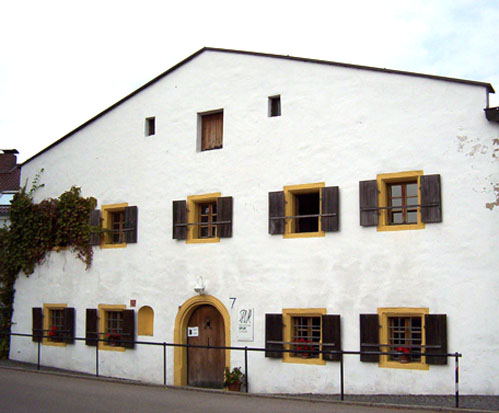
Spur Museum in Cham, Germany

Gruppe SPUR was an artistic collaboration formed by the German painters Heimrad Prem, Helmut Sturm, and Hans-Peter Zimmer, and the sculptor Lothar Fischer in 1957. They published a journal of the same name Spur.

Spur was subject to prosecution and was convicted "in the name of moral order".

The Spur group joined and collaborated with the Situationist International, a restricted group of international revolutionaries, between 1959 and 1961. After a series of core divergences during 1960–1, the Spur members were officially excluded from the SI on 10 February 1962. The events that led to the exclusion were: during the Fourth SI Conference in London (December 1960), in a discussion about the political nature of the SI, Spur group disagreed with the core situationist stance of counting on a revolutionary proletariat; the accusation that their activities were based on a "systematic misunderstanding of situationist theses"; the fact that at least one Spur member, Lothar Fischer, and possibly the rest of the group, were not actually understanding and/or agreeing with the situationist ideas, but were just using the SI to get success in the art market; and the betrayal of a common agreement on the Spur and SI publications. The exclusion was the recognition that the Spur group's "principles, methods and goals" were significantly in contrast with those of the SI. This split however was not a declaration of hostilities, as in other cases of SI exclusions. A few months after the exclusion, in the context of Judicial prosecution against the group by the German state, Debord expressed his esteem to the Spur group, calling it the only significant artistic group in Germany since WW2, and at the level of the avant-gardes in other countries.

The SPUR artists met first at the Academy of Fine Arts Munich in Munich, Germany. They formed the group in 1957, which lasted until 1965.

== Censorship, police, and juridical persecutions ==
Guy Debord remarked that while between 1920 and 1933 "Germany incontestably had the highest rank in the elaboration of art and, more generally, the culture of our era", from the post-war era to 1960, "Germany has been characterized by a total cultural void and by the dullest conformism". The Spur journal was a flourishing exception to such void and conformism, as it was, for the first time in decades, an artistic group that manifested a certain freedom of investigation, and as an "extremely worrisome symptom", this group was almost immediately the object of police and juridical persecutions. Helmet Sturim, Dieter Kunzelmann, Heimrad Prem and H.P. Zimmer each received 5 months in prison.

The Spur group was the first German group after the war to reappear on the international plane, to make itself recognized as an equal by the cultural avant-garde of several different countries, in the real artistic experiments of today; whereas the artists and intellectuals currently honored in Germany are only retarded and timid imitators of imported, old ideas.

Debord noted that Western Europe and the Scandinavian countries, had another level of intellectual tolerance, that such a trial was, at that moment, unthinkable in Paris or Copenhagen. That clumsy affair had already harmed the reputation of the Federal German Republic. Debord asserted that the pretext by which the Spur group was brought to trial, was "to make the Spur group, and all those who wish to pursue the same route, succumb to the ambient conformism." Debord ridiculed that trial to the prosecutions of Baudelaire and Flaubert for pornography and immorality in the 19th century France:

For a very long time [thereafter], one could only refer to these [French] judgments as evidence of the scandalous imbecility of the judges. It is necessary to think of them today. Before history, artistic liberty always wins its trials.

== Relations with the Situationist International ==
The Spur group collaborated with the Situationist International, a restricted group of international revolutionaries, between 1959 and 1961, when the Spur members joined the SI. After a series of core divergences during 1960–1, the Spur members were officially excluded from the SI on 10 February 1962. After this, despite the two organizations having a "sufficiently large objective opposition between their respective principles, methods, and goals," Guy Debord expressed esteem to Spur, considering it the highest expression of German art and culture of post WW2. However, after the exclusion and split, the two groups remained distinct and separated, and each was only responsible for its autonomous actions.

The first contact with Situationist International happened through Asger Jorn. Jorn, one of the most prominent members of the SI, discovered the SPUR-paintings at a gallery managed by art dealer Otto Van de Loo. Later on, the Spur members come to join and became members of the Situationist International, forming the majority of the members of the German section of the SI.

A major point of divergence came up from the Spur group during The Fourth SI Conference in London (December 1960). The discussion of a report by Attila Kotányi, leads to posing the question: "To what extent is the SI a political movement?" Various responses state that the SI is political, but not in the ordinary sense. The discussion becomes somewhat confusing. Debord proposes, to bring out the opinion of the Conference, that each person responds in writing to a questionnaire asking if he considers that there are "forces in the society that the SI can count on? What forces? In what conditions?" This questionnaire is agreed upon and filled out. When, a day later, the Spur members present a joint response to the questionnaire, in which they reject the concept of a proletarian revolution, it generates a sharp debate:

This very long declaration attacks the tendency in the responses read the day before to count on the existence of a revolutionary proletariat, for the signers strongly doubt the revolutionary capacities of the workers against the bureaucratic institutions that have dominated their movement. The German section considers that the SI should prepare to realize its program on its own by mobilizing the avant-garde artists, who are placed by the present society in intolerable conditions and can count only on themselves to take over the weapons of conditioning.

This position was critiqued by Debord, Nash, Kotányi, and Jorn. The majority of the S.I. seems to be against it, and the Spur members are asked to formalize their position so it can be brought to a vote. But, when the Spur group returned from their deliberation, they retract the preceding declaration. Debord starts to suspect that the Spur members were not understanding and/or agreeing with the situationist ideas and that they were instead using the SI to get success in the art market. As a consequence, during the Fifth SI Conference held in Gothenburg, Sweden, 28–30 August 1961, Asger Jorn (signing himself as "George Keller") proposed to unify the S.I. publications in the various countries (including Spur) as a single journal, to be translated in four editions in English, French, German and Swedish. The reaction of the Spur members to this proposal was mentioned in the conference report:

The German situationists who publish the journal Spur agree to the project in principle, but prefer to postpone its implementation until the time is right; such that the majority of the Conference abstains from voting on a question rejected by the situationists most directly concerned. They stress the urgency, already made evident by the Conference, for them to unify their positions and projects with the rest of the SI. Kunzelmann declares that this discussion could advance quickly based on Vaneigem's report, which would be studied more closely in Germany. Nonetheless, the Germans commit themselves to propagate and elaborating situationist theory as soon as possible, as they have begun doing with issues #5 and #6 of Spur. On their request, the Conference adds Attila Kotányi and J. de Jong to the editorial committee of Spur to verify this process of unification.

Despite Spur's agreement to add Attila Kotányi and Jacqueline de Jong to the editorial committee of Spur, the following issue #7 was printed five months later without Kotányi and de Jong's knowledge. Issue #7 featured considerable divergences with the SI ideas, marking a distinct regression from the preceding #5 and #6 issues. These events led the following month, February 1962, to the exclusion from the SI of those responsible.

The arguments for the exclusion, declared in a letter on 10 February 1962, were that "fractional activity of this group is based on a systematic misunderstanding of situationist theses", that they were using the Situationists to succeed on the art market and that to achieve this they had "perfectly disregarded the discipline of the S.I.". On the accusation of using the SI to "arrive" as artists, Spur member Dieter Kunzelmann admitted that it applied for sure to Lothar Fischer, but rejected that it was true for the other Spur members present at the Fifth SI Conference in Gothenburg.
