= Theses on the Paris Commune =

The Situationist International's interpretation of the Paris Commune of 1871 was influenced by their collaboration with Henri Lefebvre with whom they had been in contact since the late 1950s. Lefebvre’s writings on revolutionary romanticism and everyday life were important influences on the early SI. In the early 1960s Guy Debord, Attila Kotányi and Raoul Vaneigem agreed to assist Lefebvre in his preparations for a book on the Commune (which he eventually published in 1965 as La Proclamation de la Commune).

The results of their brainstorming sessions were written down in 1962 by the SI in their "Theses on the Paris Commune" (French: "Thèses situationnistes sur la Commune de Paris"). After Lefebvre published his respective notes on their collaboration, in a 1962 piece entitled "La Signification de la Commune," the two parties had a falling out as the SI ostensibly disagreed with the journal in which he published. Both the SI and Lefebvre published extensively on the feud in the following decade.

Debord, Kotányi and Vaneigem gave the theses the symbolic date of 18 March; the anniversary of the start of the Commune. The theses remained unpublished in their official journal until its final issue in 1969. The SI's interpretation of the Commune is informed by their libertarian Marxism. Henri Lefebvre’s influence on the theses is notable in the theses' preoccupation with everyday life, social space, and the Commune as a revolutionary festival. The SI’s interpretation of the Commune is also clearly influenced by their own activist programs in the late 1950s and early 1960s. For instance, in the seventh thesis the authors applaud the Communards’ violence against monuments, as signs of capitalist power, and claim that the Commune "represents the only implementation of a revolutionary urbanism to date." In their own unitary urbanism program and other writings the SI advocated similar attacks on the signs of capitalism and their practice of constructing situations was very much intertwined with a transformation of social space.
