= Spectacle (critical theory) =

View of media, markets and commodities as sovereign, central to Situationist thought

The spectacle is a central notion in the Situationist theory, developed by Guy Debord in his 1967 book The Society of the Spectacle. In the general sense, the spectacle refers to "the autocratic reign of the market economy which had acceded to an irresponsible sovereignty, and the totality of new techniques of government which accompanied this reign." It also exists in a more limited sense, where spectacle means the mass media, which are "its most glaring superficial manifestation."

The critique of the spectacle is a development and application of Karl Marx's concept of fetishism of commodities, reification and alienation, and the way it was reprised by György Lukács in 1923. In the society of the spectacle, commodities rule the workers and consumers, instead of being ruled by them; in this way, individuals become passive subjects who contemplate the reified (or solidified) spectacle.

== Description ==
Debord uses the word "Spectacle" to describe an overall social phenomenon where everything directly lived recedes into a representation, describing it as "a separate pseudo-world that can only be looked at", created from the rearrangement of fragmented images taken from every aspect of life. It is a worldview that identifies human social life with appearances, leading to the perceived autonomous motion of commodities and images and the negation of social life. But in the second chapter of The Society of the Spectacle, Debord turns from the superficially visible nature of the spectacle to its material side, describing it as the outgrowth of commodity fetishism as the production and consumption of commodities colonizes all of social life. As a form of false consciousness, the Spectacle is described by Debord as a social relationship in which alienated individuals are connected to the social whole through the spectacular pseudo-world.

Prof. Hans-Georg Moeller at the University of Macau has characterized the Spectacle as being composed of three theoretical components:

1. The semiotics of how spectacular images relate to reality
2. The political economy that produces the spectacle
3. The ontology of what is really true in a society organized around the production of appearances

=== Forms ===
==== Concentrated spectacle ====
Throughout The Society of the Spectacle, Debord describes the spectacle as seen in the West in its diffuse form; however, he applies the concept to the Marxist-Leninist and Fascist states of the 20th century where there was a similar conflict between reality and media images. He develops the concept of the "concentrated spectacle" that is associated with concentrated bureaucracy. Debord also associates this form of spectacle with mixed backward economies and advanced capitalist countries in times of crisis. Every aspect of life—like property, music, and communication—is concentrated and is identified with the bureaucratic class. The concentrated spectacle generally identifies itself with a powerful political leader. The concentrated spectacle is made effective through a state of permanent violence and police terror.

==== Diffuse spectacle ====
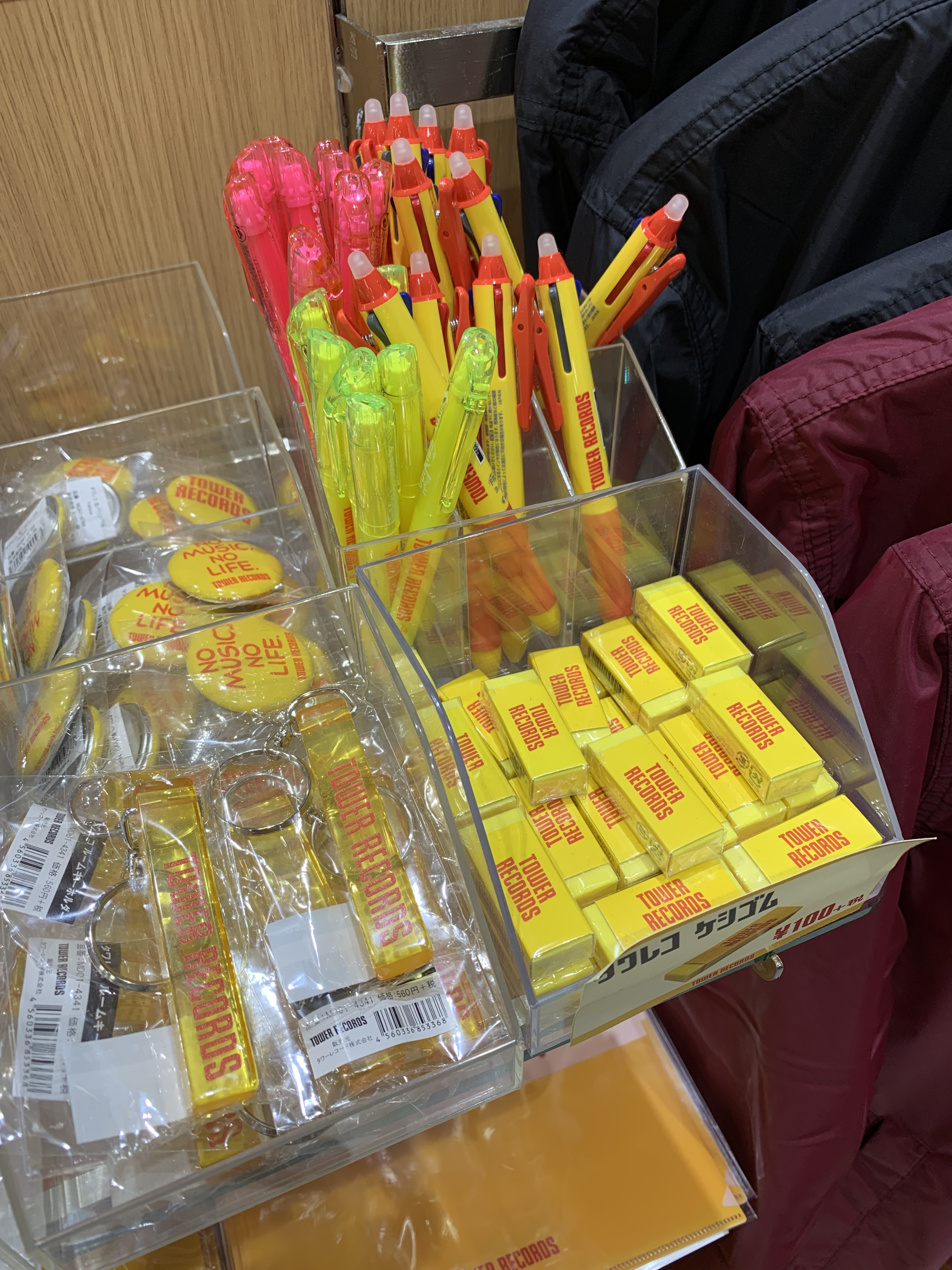
Debord cited promotional merchandise as a means by which consumers participate in the diffuse spectacle.

The diffuse spectacle is the spectacle associated with advanced capitalism and commodity abundance. In the diffuse spectacle, each commodity appears at the center of an envisioned society organized around its consumption, negating all other commodities. The spectacle offers satisfaction through the realization of every commodity's social vision, but only fragments of this satisfaction are accessible.

Irreconcilable claims jockey for position on the stage of the affluent economy's unified spectacle, and different star commodities simultaneously promote conflicting social policies. The automobile spectacle, for example, strives for a perfect traffic flow entailing the destruction of old urban districts, while the city spectacle needs to preserve those districts as tourist attractions.

— Guy Debord, The Society of the Spectacle

The diffuse spectacle operates mostly through seduction, while the concentrated spectacle operates mostly through violence. Because of this, Debord argues that the diffuse spectacle is more effective at suppressing non-spectacular opinions than the concentrated spectacle.

==== Integrated spectacle ====
In Comments on the Society of the Spectacle (1988), Debord asserted that in the two decades since the publication of The Society of the Spectacle, a new form of spectacle has emerged in modern capitalist countries that integrates features of both the diffuse and concentrated spectacle. Debord argues that this was pioneered in France and Italy. According to Debord, the integrated spectacle goes by the label of liberal democracy. This spectacle introduces a state of permanent general secrecy, where experts and specialists dictate the morality, statistics, and opinions of the spectacle. Terrorism is the invented enemy of the spectacle, which specialists compare with their "liberal democracy", pointing out the superiority of the latter one. Debord argues that without terrorism, the integrated spectacle wouldn't survive, for it needs to be compared to something in order to show its "obvious" perfection and superiority.

=== Terrain ===
==== Spectacular Time ====
Debord conceived the commodified consumable experiences of the spectacle to be a form of "pseudocyclical time", in contrast to the "irreversible time" created by the overall forward direction of socioeconomic development that came with the Industrial Revolution. Debord said that the society of the spectacle came to existence in the late 1920s with the rise of mass media. According to him, to turn workers into consumers, capitalism needed to first expropriate their time, noting "the time that modern society is constantly seeking to "save" by increasing transportation speeds or using packaged soups ends up being spent by the American population in watching television three to six hours a day". Thus, the overall project of the Situationists was to destroy the pseudocyclical time of the spectacle and create "a federation of independent times - a federation of playful individual and collective forms of irreversible time that are simultaneously present", and with the proletariat conscious of their place in time and history, bring about "authentic communism, which abolishes everything that exists independently of individuals."

==== The City ====
Debord saw the creation of the proletariat, collectively disempowered but brought together into the same urban spaces by the same capitalist system as one of capitalism's contradictions that threatened to negate it from within. Thus, capitalism survived by building over this space of authentic life with urban planning, in which life is dominated by vision. For the situationists, this urban space was fertile for the creation of situations, mainly through the dérive.

=== Recuperation ===
As early as 1958, in the situationist manifesto, Debord described official culture as a "rigged game", where conservative powers forbid subversive ideas to have direct access to the public discourse. Such ideas get first trivialized and sterilized, and then they are safely incorporated back within mainstream society, where they can be exploited to add new flavors to old dominant ideas. This technique of the spectacle is sometimes called recuperation.

To survive, the spectacle must maintain social control and effectively handle all threats to the social order. Recuperation, a concept first proposed by Guy Debord, is the process by which the spectacle intercepts socially and politically radical ideas and images, commodifies them, and safely incorporates them back within mainstream society. More broadly, it may refer to the appropriation or co-opting of any subversive works or ideas by mainstream media. It is the opposite of détournement, in which conventional ideas and images are reorganized and recontextualized with radical intentions.

Debord discusses the close link between revolution and culture and everyday life, and the reason why conservative powers are interested in forbidding them "any direct access to the rigged game of official culture." Debord recalls that worldwide revolutionary movements that emerged during the 1920s were followed by "an ebbing of the movements that had tried to advance a liberatory new attitude in culture and everyday life," and that such movements were brought to a "complete social isolation."

== History and influences ==
=== Bernays and Adorno ===
Debord claims that in its limited sense, spectacle means the mass media, which are "its most glaring superficial manifestation". However, T. J. Clark regards this as a journalistic cliché. Clark argues that the spectacle came to dominate Paris during the Second Empire thanks to Haussmann's renovation of Paris. Debord, however, said that the society of the spectacle came to existence in the late 1920s. This is the period in which modern advertising and public relations were introduced, most significantly with the innovative techniques developed by Edward Bernays in his campaigns for the tobacco industry. In his 1928 book Propaganda, Bernays theorized the "conscious and intelligent manipulation of the organized habits and opinions of the masses." The critique of the society of the spectacle shares many assumptions and arguments with the critique of the culture industry made by Theodor W. Adorno and Max Horkheimer in 1944.

=== Marx and Lukács ===
With The Society of the Spectacle, Debord attempted to provide the Situationist International (SI) with a Marxist critical theory. The concept of "the spectacle" expanded to all society the Marxist concept of reification drawn from the first section of Karl Marx's Capital, entitled The Fetishism of Commodities and the Secret thereof and developed by György Lukács in his work, History and Class Consciousness. This was an analysis of the logic of commodities whereby they achieve an ideological autonomy from the process of their production, so that "social action takes the form of the action of objects, which rule the producers instead of being ruled by them."

Developing this analysis of the logic of the commodity, The Society of the Spectacle generally understood society as divided between the passive subject who consumes the spectacle and the reified spectacle itself. In a spectacular society, the system of commodity production generates a continual stream of images, for consumption by people who lack the experiences represented therein. The spectacle represents people solely in terms of their subordination to commodities, and experience itself becomes commodified.

The spectacle in general, as the concrete inversion of life, is the autonomous movement of the non-living.

— Guy Debord, The Society of the Spectacle

In the opening of Das Kapital, Marx makes the observation that within the capitalist mode of production we evaluate materials not by what purpose they serve or what they're actually useful for, but we instead recognize them based on their value in the market. In capitalist society, virtually identical products often have vastly different values simply because one has a more recognizable or prestigious brand name. The value of a commodity is abstract and not tied to its actual characteristics. Much in the same way capitalism commodifies the material world, the situationists assert that advanced capitalism commodifies experience and perception.

We live in a spectacular society, that is, our whole life is surrounded by an immense accumulation of spectacles. Things that were once directly lived are now lived by proxy. Once an experience is taken out of the real world it becomes a commodity. As a commodity the spectacular is developed to the detriment of the real. It becomes a substitute for experience.

— Lawrence Law, Images and Everyday Life

== Legacy ==
A long tradition of work exists in political science on the "political spectacle" which started with Debord; many literary critics and philosophers in the 20th century contributed to this analysis. According to anthropologist Meg McLagan, "Debord analyzes the penetration of the commodity form into mass communication, which he argues results in the spectacle". Andrew Hussey claims in his biography of Debord that the term spectacle began life not in a Marxist context, but was first borrowed from Nietzsche and his concept of the mass secret. The critic Sadie Plant argues that later theories of postmodernism, particularly those of Baudrillard and Lyotard, owe much to Debord's theory, and represent an apolitical appropriation of its criticism of the unreality of life under late capitalism. Debord was a rebel to his core and despised academic commodification of his ideas and their integration into the diffuse spectacle. Throughout his life he fought to make his ideas truly revolutionary.

In Green Illusions, Ozzie Zehner draws largely on Debord to argue that the spectacles of solar cells, wind turbines, and other technologies have organized environmental thinking around energy-production at the expense of energy-reduction strategies.
