= Dérive =

Unplanned urban exploration tour

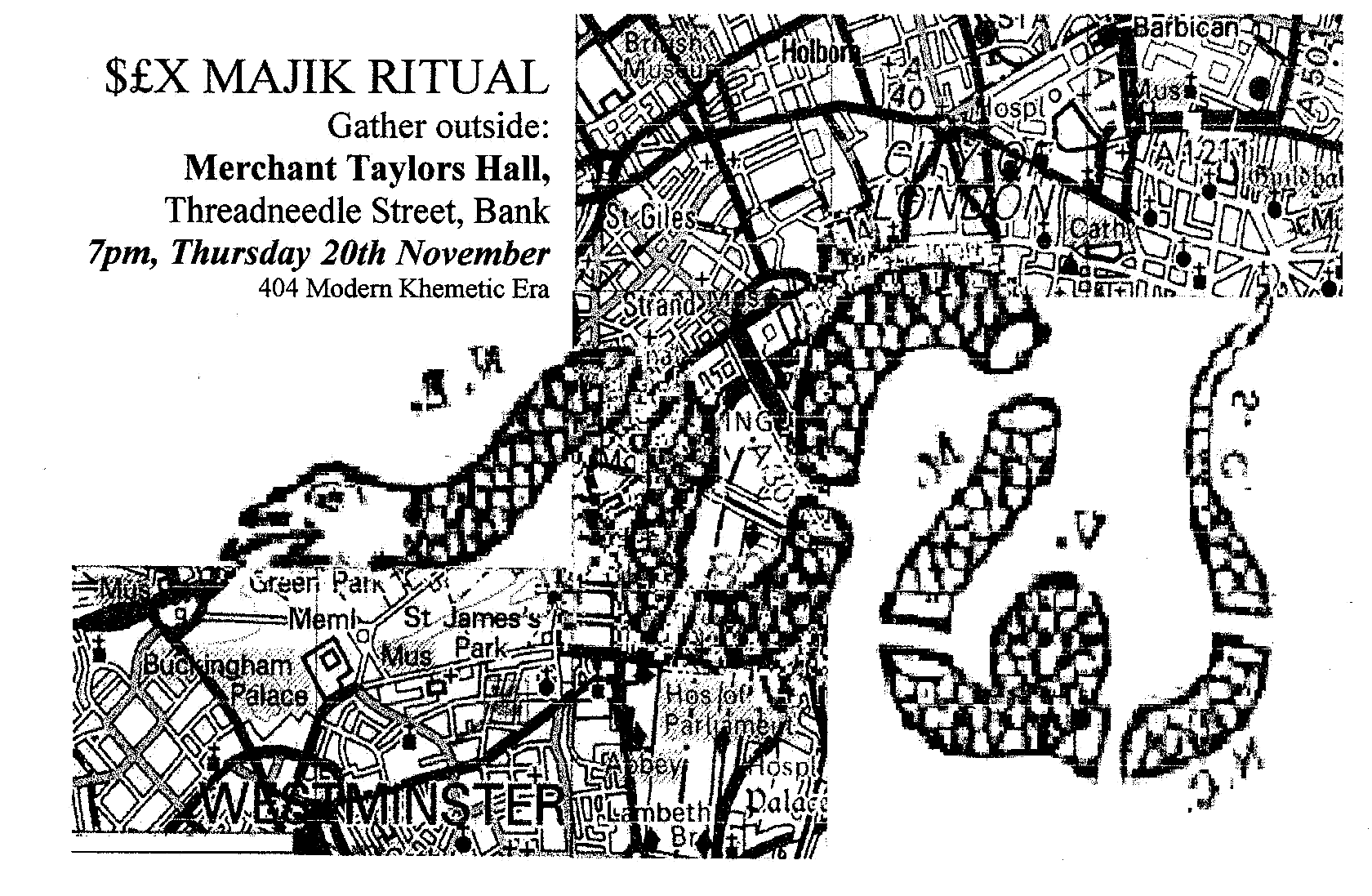
A 2004 poster announcing a large-scale dérive in London, led by a psychogeographical society

A dérive (French: [de.ʁiv], "drift") is an unplanned journey through a landscape, usually urban, in which participants stop focusing on their everyday relations to their social environment. Developed by members of the Letterist International, it was first publicly theorized in Guy Debord's "Theory of the Dérive" (1956). Debord defines the dérive as "a mode of experimental behaviour linked to the conditions of urban society: a technique of rapid passage through varied ambiances."

Though solo dérives are possible, Debord indicates

that the most fruitful numerical arrangement consists of several small groups of two or three people who have reached the same level of awareness, since cross-checking these different groups' impressions makes it possible to arrive at more objective conclusions.

In an interview, the sociologist Henri Lefebvre, who was close to the group in its early years, recalled that some early dérives used walkie-talkies to coordinate participants moving through different parts of a city. According to Lefebvre, the aim was to link areas separated in space—one group would explore one neighbourhood while staying in radio contact with another elsewhere—so that the fragmented city could be experienced simultaneously rather than only in succession. He associated these experiments with Constant and unitary urbanism, saying the technique "was done first in Amsterdam, using walkie-talkies" and was later used in Strasbourg, though he was uncertain of the exact dates.

The dérive's goals include studying the terrain of the city (psychogeography) and emotional disorientation, both of which lead to the potential creation of Situations.

== History ==
The concept of the dérive has its origins in the Letterist International, an avant-garde and Marxist collective based in Paris. The dérive was a critical tool for understanding and developing the theory of psychogeography, defined as the "specific effects of the geographical environment (whether consciously organized or not) on the emotions and behavior of individuals."

The dérive continued to be a critical concept in the theories of the Situationist International, a radical group of avant-garde artists and political theorists that was formed out of the Letterist International, CoBrA, and the International Movement for an Imaginist Bauhaus in the 1950s. For the Situationists, the dérive was a revolutionary technique to combat the malaise and boredom of the society of the spectacle.

Dérives are necessary, according to Situationist theory, because of the increasingly predictable and monotonous experience of everyday life in advanced capitalism. Debord observes in his Introduction to a Critique of Urban Geography:

The sudden change of ambiance in a street within the space of a few meters; the evident division of a city into zones of distinct psychic atmospheres; the path of least resistance that is automatically followed in aimless strolls (and which has no relation to the physical contour of the terrain); the appealing or repelling character of certain places—these phenomena all seem to be neglected. In any case they are never envisaged as depending on causes that can be uncovered by careful analysis and turned to account.

— Guy Debord, Introduction to a Critique of Urban Geography

In his manifesto for unitary urbanism, Raoul Vaneigem articulated some further ideas behind the dérive and the Situationist critique of space: "All space is occupied by the enemy. We are living under a permanent curfew. Not just the cops—the geometry". Dérive, as a previously conceptualized tactic in the French military, was "a calculated action determined by the absence of a greater locus", and "a maneuver within the enemy's field of vision". To the SI, whose interest was inhabiting space, the dérive brought appeal in this sense of taking the "fight" to the streets and truly indulging in a determined operation.

== Praxis ==
Several groups have adopted the concept of the dérive and applied it in their own form, including many modern organizations, most notably the Loiterers Resistance Movement (Manchester), Wrights & Sites, and the Providence Initiative for Psychogeographic Studies. Since 2003 in the United States, separate events known as the Providence Initiative for Psychogeographic Studies and Psy-Geo-Conflux have been dedicated to action-based participatory experiments similar to the dérive within the context of psychogeography.

== Technology ==
In March 2020, an iOS and Android app called Randonautica launched and cited Guy Debord's essay on dérive as a core inspiration. It uses a random number generator to seed a random map location that the user is prompted to walk to while holding an intention in mind.

== See also ==
- A Moveable Feast
- Flâneur
- Parkour
