= Helmut Sturm =

German painter and Situationist (1932–2008)

Helmut Sturm (21 February 1932 – 20 February 2008) was a German painter.

He was born in Furth im Wald. From 1952 to 1958, he studied at the Akademie der Bildenden Künste, Munich. After this he joined Heimrad Prem, Lothar Fischer and Hans-Peter Zimmer in founding Gruppe SPUR, which in 1959 entered the Situationist International. He had a six-month scholarship in Paris before returning to Munich for the SPUR exhibition in Galerie van de Loo. He collaborated with Hans Platschek, Asger Jorn, Jørgen Nash, Constant, Maurice Wyckaert, Giuseppe Pinot-Gallizio and Guy Debord. In 1961 he stayed with Nash at Oerkelljunga, Sweden with Prem, Zimmer and Dieter Kunzelmann.

After the SPUR group was expelled from the Situationist International, they continued to do collaborative work, linking up with Wir in 1966 to form Geflecht. Sturm developed colorspatial anti-objects and had his first solo exhibition in the Galerie van de Loo, Munich.

From 1970 he worked as an Art educator, developing a Child Forum with Galerie van de Loo. In 1975 he set up the Kollektiv Herzogstrasse with Prem. From 1980 to 1982, he was guest professor at the Hochschule der Künste, Berlin, taking over Hann Trier's class. He continued to exhibit across Germany and from 1985 to 1998 was professor at the Akademie der Bildenden Künste, Munich. In 2007 he was awarded the Friedrich Baur Prize in the fine arts category. He died in February 2008 in Munich.
