= Report on the Construction of Situations =

1957 revolutionary manifesto

Report on the Construction of Situations (French: Rapport sur la construction des situations) is the founding manifesto of the Situationist International revolutionary organization. The pamphlet was published by Guy Debord in June 1957, and the following month the organization was founded in Cosio d'Arroscia, Italy.

The organization was founded by the fusion of three organizations: the Lettrist International, the International Movement for an Imaginist Bauhaus, and the London Psychogeographical Association.

The complete title is Report on the Construction of Situations and on the International Situationist Tendency’s Conditions of Organization and Action.

== Content ==
=== Revolutionary movement ===
Expressing the view of the national leaders of the previous organizations, particularly Jorn, Debord, Gallizio and Korun, this report defines the main political aim of the movement as revolutionary:

First, we believe that the world must be changed. We desire the most liberatory possible change of the society and the life in which we find ourselves confined. We know that such change is possible by means of pertinent actions.

During the May 1968 general strike, the Situationists, against the unions and the Communist Party that were starting to side with the de Gaulle government to contain the revolt, called for the formation of workers' councils to take control of the factories, expelling union leaders and left-wing bureaucrats, in order to keep the power in the hands of the workers with direct democracy.

=== The imbecilization of young people in families and schools ===
The imbecilization that young people undergo within their families and schools, has then a natural continuation in the "deliberately anticultural production" of novels, films, et cetera, conducted with the means of large-scale industry.

In his 1961 film Critique of Separation, Debord returned on this topic adding:

The spectacle as a whole is nothing other than [...] the gap between the visions, tastes, refusals and projects that previously characterized this youth and the way it has advanced into ordinary life.

In contrast, the sense of the Report on the Construction of Situations is to fulfill human primitive desires and pursue a superior passional quality. The main goal of the Situationist International is precisely the setting up of environments that favor such fulfillments.

=== Official culture and the trivialization and sterilization of the subversive ===
For Debord, official culture is a "rigged game", where conservative powers forbid subversive ideas to have direct access to the public discourse, and where such ideas are integrated only after being trivialized and sterilized.

Debord discusses the close link between revolution and culture and everyday life, and the reason why conservative powers are interested in forbidding them "any direct access to the rigged game of official culture." Debord recalls that worldwide revolutionary movements that emerged during the 1920s were followed by "an ebbing of the movements that had tried to advance a liberatory new attitude in culture and everyday life," and that such movements were brought to a "complete social isolation."

=== Emptiness of an art separated from politics ===
Historically, revolutionary ideas have emerged first among artists and intellectuals. For this reason, artists and intellectuals are relegated into specialized, compartmentalized disciplines, defusing their revolutionary potential and imposing unnatural dichotomies such as the "separation of art from politics". Once artistic-intellectual works are separated from current events and from a comprehensive critique of society, they are sterilized and can be safely integrated into the official culture and the public discourse, where they can add new flavors to old dominant ideas and play the role of a gear wheel in the mechanism of the society of the spectacle.

One of the contradictions of the bourgeoisie [...] is that while it respects the abstract principle of intellectual and artistic creation, it resists actual creations when they first appear, then eventually exploits them. This is because it needs to maintain a certain sense of criticality and experimental research among a minority, but must take care to channel this activity into narrowly compartmentalized utilitarian disciplines, dismissing all comprehensive critique and research. In the domain of culture, the bourgeoisie strives to divert the taste for the new, which has become dangerous for it, toward certain degraded forms of novelty that are harmless and confused. [...] The people within avant-garde tendencies who distinguished themselves are generally accepted on an individual basis, at the price of vital renunciations: the fundamental point of debate is always the renunciation of comprehensive demands, and the acceptance of a fragmentary work, susceptible to multiple interpretations. This is what makes the very term avant-garde, which in the end is always defined and manipulated by the bourgeoisie, somewhat suspicious and ridiculous. ( pp.2-3 )

In his 1959 film On the Passage of a Few Persons Through a Rather Brief Unity of Time, Debord returned on this topic adding:

Knowledge of empirical facts remains abstract and superficial as long as it is not concretized by being related to the whole situation. This is the only method that enables us to supersede partial and abstract problems and get to their concrete essence, and thus implicitly to their meaning. [...] We can never really challenge any form of social organization without challenging all of that organization’s forms of language. [...] When freedom is practiced in a closed circle, it fades into a dream, becomes a mere image of itself.

== Editions and translations ==
- Original French text Rapport sur la construction des situations, Rapport sur la construction des situations
- English translations:
  - by Ken Knabb (online)
  - by Tom McDonough, published in Guy Debord and the Situationist International
- Italian translation: published by Nautilus.

== See also ==
- Council for Maintaining the Occupations
