= Randonautica =

Coordinate-generating application

- The logo features an owl getting a new perspective.
- Developer: Randonauts LLC
- Initial release: February 22, 2020
- Stable release: v. 2.16.4 (Android), v. 15.0.0 (iOS)
- Operating system: iOS; Android
- Available in: German, English, Spanish, Russian, French, Indonesian, Italian, Korean, Dutch, Polish, Portuguese, Turkish
- Type: Alternate Reality Game
- Website: www.randonautica.com

Randonautica (a portmanteau of "random" + "nautica") is an app launched on February 22, 2020 founded by Auburn Salcedo and Joshua Lengfelder. It randomly generates coordinates that encourages the user to explore their local area and report what is found. According to its creators, the app is "an attractor of strange things," letting one choose specific coordinates based on a specific theme. It gained controversy after a report of two teenagers coincidentally finding a corpse while using the application.

== Overview ==
The app, which creators claim to be inspired by chaos theory and Guy Debord's Theory of the Dérive, offers its users three types of coordinates to choose from: an attractor, a void, or an anomaly. The app has a cult following on YouTube and TikTok and there is a subreddit made by the creators for users of the app.

== History ==
29-year-old circus performer Joshua Lengfelder discovered a bot called Fatum Project in a fringe science chat group on Telegram in January 2019. According to The New York Times, "He absorbed the project’s theories about how random exploration could break people out of their predetermined realities, and how people could influence random outcomes with their minds." Lengfelder then created a Telegram bot using Fatum Project's code, generating coordinates. He then created the subreddit r/randonauts in March. In October, developer Simon Nishi McCorkindale made the bot's webpage.

With the help of Auburn Salcedo, chief executive of a TV agency, both created Randonauts LLC. Salcedo became the chief operating officer while Lengfelder was the CEO. The app, called Randonautica, was launched on February 22, 2020. Later the same year the app and back-end got completely overhauled by a new team of developers and got a more visual and friendlier design and logo.

In April 2022 Lengfelder exited Randonauts LLC and Auburn Salcedo became CEO.

== Reception ==
The app has as many as 10.8 million users as of July 2020, gaining popularity amid the COVID-19 pandemic in the United States as restrictions have been lightened. Emma Chamberlain made a YouTube video about the app that helped increase its following. i-D reported that the hashtag #randonautica has gained 176.5 million views on TikTok, although it has not marketed itself yet.

=== Controversy ===
"When you’re sending millions of people to random locations and searching the hidden corners of reality, you’re bound to find some pretty shocking stuff sometimes. It’s not the best press, but I’m not really that upset about it, because it’s kind of cool. I kind of wish it was me who found it."

— Joshua Lengfelder, founder of Randonautica, in response to the controversial video.

With the app's popularity, users started reporting coincidences which many find unsettling. The majority of reports were from TikTok and Reddit, as well as Telegram.

The most notable controversy involved a group of people heading to a beach in Duwamish Head, Puget Sound, West Seattle per the app, where they found a bag with two dead bodies, a 27-year-old male and a 36-year-old female, as reported by the Seattle Police homicide detectives. In August 2020, police arrested and charged their landlord, Michael Lee Dudley, in connection with the murders. In March 2021, Dudley was denied bail while other people were under suspicion of aiding Dudley in the dismemberment and disposal of the bodies, but no one else had been charged. This has caused speculation that the app has an intended, puzzle-like theme. However, Lengfelder stated that it is "a shocking coincidence." Salcedo called the videos fake, and that "It’s so hard to manage, because people are really taking creative liberties after seeing how much traction the app is getting in that fear factor." In 2022, Michael Dudley was convicted of second degree murder for killing both victims, who were identified as Jessica Lewis and Austin Wenner. He was sentenced to 46 years in prison the following year.

In their questions page, Randonautica's creators have said that if the app generates coordinates inside a private property, it is a violation of their terms and conditions to trespass. In addition, Randonautica has also received allegations that the app is used for human trafficking, which its creators have denied, saying that data collected by the app are anonymous. It also ensured that the app is not designed to violate religious customs, saying that "the app is simply a tool. Just as a knife can be used either to prepare dinner or to cut somebody."

== See also ==
- Geocaching
- Geohashing, another game of visiting random coordinates
- Pokémon Go, an app with similar controversies
- Ingress, as above
