= André Frankin =

André Frankin was a Belgian Lettrist and Situationist.

He wrote:

- Platform for a Cultural Revolution, (IS#3) . It provided modifications to An appeal to Revolutionary Intellectuals and Artists which was planned to be published at the opening of the Third Conference of the Situationist International held in Munich on 17–20 April 1959
- Programmatic Outlines, (IS#4) which analyses the non-future as a theoretical element of the construction of situations in a transitory socialist society.
- Preface to the Scenic Unity "The Person and the others", (IS#5) which is a critique of theatre.

He resigned from the Situationist International in March 1961.

Of Frankin, Jean-Marie Apostolidès said: "André Frankin is not well-known and his impact on the lettrist and situationist movements are hard to measure".
