= Stalingrad (painting) =

Painting by Asger Jorn

- Artist: Asger Jorn
- Year: 1972
- Medium: Oil on canvas
- Dimensions: 296 cm × 492 cm (117 in × 194 in)
- Location: Museum Jorn, Silkeborg, Silkeborg, Denmark

Stalingrad is a 1972 oil painting by Danish artist Asger Jorn. It was first developed in 1956, and continued to be added to over the course of two decades before being finalized in 1972. It is conceptually grounded in the futility of war, abstractly depicting the Battle of Stalingrad. Critics have considered it one of Denmark's 20th century artistic masterpieces, and it was subsequently included in the Danish Culture Canon. The canvas, 296 cm × 492 cm (117 in × 194 in), now hangs in Museum Jorn, Silkeborg.

== Background ==
In the 1950s, after a long and difficult period in hospital suffering from tuberculosis, Jorn had embarked on figurative painting hoping to reestablish himself at the European level. He often stylistically reacted against his method as a painter, overpainting the edges or the background to create artifacts. By 1956, he had set up a studio in the small Italian town of Albisola near Genoa, where he began to compose a large painting that he initially titled La ritirata di Russia (The Retreat from Russia); the painting had been inspired by stories told by his friend Umberto Gambetta, who had fought with the Italians in the Battle of Stalingrad (1942–1943) before spending years in Russian prisoner-of-war camps from which few survived. The painting had seemed to have detailed these events to such an extent that Gambetta referred to it as "my portrait"; Jorn ensured that all such personal references were covered over so as to enhance the work's universal significance. He then renamed the painting Le fou rire (sometimes translated The Mad Laughter) and sent it off to Brussels where a collector had shown interest in the painting; it was acquired by the restaurant owner Albert Niels who allowed Jorn to work on it further. It was also seen by the Dutch museum expert Willem Sandberg who arranged for it to be sent to the Seattle World Fair in 1961. Subsequently, the final painting, eventually completed in 1972, was renamed Stalingrad.

== Description ==
Like Picasso's painting Guernica, the painting addresses the horrors of war, in this case depicting the Battle of Stalingrad, one of the most notable events of the Second World War. Jorn's impression of warfare is conveyed above all in the process behind the painting. Indeed, his thick coating of colour is more of a process in its own right than a representation, revealing war as a phenomenon beyond man's understanding. Stalingrad could be seen as an enormous battlefield where all traces of mankind and civilisation were buried under layers of snow. An outline of a body or the suggestion of a face can perhaps be discerned but under the surface, the destruction and upheaval are already fading from memory. Jorn sees war as a tragedy of madness, completely devoid of heroism. Created at a time when mankind lived under the threat of nuclear war, the painting can be seen as the artist's personal expression of a world lamenting its own end.

== Finalization ==
Jorn referred to Stalingrad as a work that he could continue to add to throughout his life; in the mid-1960s, he presented a version with additions to the Silkeborg Museum in 1966, and it was exhibited in Paris and Cuba before being hung in a local museum. Jorn worked on final adjustments on-location, adding a few black dots representing houses in December 1972 shortly before he died.
