= Scandinavian Institute of Comparative Vandalism =

Danish non-profit organization

The Scandinavian Institute of Comparative Vandalism (Danish: Skandinavisk institut for sammenlignende vandalisme) is a non-profit cultural institute based in Denmark.

It was founded in 1961 by the Danish artist Asger Jorn, Peter Glob and Werner Jacobsen from the National Museum of Denmark and Holger Arbman of the University of Lund, Sweden. Jorn had recently left the Situationist International, although he continued to support them financially. The stated purpose of the institute was to throw new light upon the Scandinavian culture in the age of migrations and Vikings. For several years, Jorn toured around Scandinavia and Europe with photographer Gérard Franceschi, former photographer for French writer and onetime culture minister André Malraux on his Musée imaginaire project, photographing ancient, Romanesque, Scandinavian, and Gothic figurative and decorative motifs in order to trace the connections between Scandinavian and European motifs. Jacqueline de Jong was also involved in several of these excursions.

In 1965, the Silkeborg municipal government provided a building to store over 20,000 photographs taken by Jorn, Gerard Franceschi and Ulrik Ross. Jorn was working with the publisher Skandinavisk Forlag in Odense to publish a series of books based on his research and documentation called 10,000 Years of Nordic Folk Art (10 000 års nordisk folkekunst). Jorn gave up the project that year, however, when the press Skandinavisk Forlag refused to proceed unless the project was run by a committee of scholars, with Jorn having only one vote. He wanted total control of the subject of each volume. The Institute remained as a sort of imaginary museum, now housed in the Silkeborg Kunstmuseum, home of Jorn's art collection and archives. Jorn continued to publish articles and books on the subject of Nordic art as a tradition independent of what he called the "Classical-Latin" tradition.

A publication series of theoretical texts (without illustration) in the name of the institute (Meddelelse fra Skandinavisk institut for sammenlignende vandalisme) encompasses four books, all by Jorn

- Naturens Orden (1962)
- Værdi og økonomi (1962)
- Held og Hasard (1963)
- Alfa og Omega (1980 posthumous)

== Notes ==
- Comparative Vandalism: Asger Jorn and the artistic attitude to life by Peter Shield, Borgen/Ashgate (1998)
- The Natural Order and Other Texts by Asger Jorn (Translated by Peter Shield), Ashgate (2002)
