= Budapest Dialogical School =

The Budapest Dialogical School was a community of thinkers, poets, artists and scientists based in Budapest, Hungary which operated during the middle of the twentieth century.

The school was led by Lajos Szabó and Béla Tábor with input from Béla Hamvas. It also attracted Attila Kotanyi.

Holocaust survivors played a significant role in the school: Szabo himself had survived Auschwitz.
