= Lothar Fischer =

German sculptor (1933–2004)

Lothar Fischer (November 8, 1933 – June 15, 2004) was a German sculptor.

He was born in Germersheim, Palatinate. Between 1952 and 1958 he studied under Professor Heinrich Kirchner at the Akademie der Bildenden Künste, Munich. In 1958, he received a three-month scholarship to the Villa Massimo in Rome from the Arnold’sche Stiftung (Arnold’sche Foundation). After this he joined the painters Heimrad Prem, Helmut Sturm and Hans-Peter Zimmer in founding the group SPUR, which in 1959 entered the Situationist International. That year he participated in the Junge Kunst (Young Art) exhibition in Ulm.

By 1962 the SPUR group had been expelled from the Situationist International. He participated in their exhibition at the Galerie van de Loo. The next year he was involved in Visione e Colore (Visions and Colours) in the Palazzo Grassi, Venice before joining other SPUR colleagues in the Nouveaux Espaces exhibition in Paris. He then had a single exhibition at the Gallery van de Loo.

He was a member of the German Artists federation from 1963 to 1994. During the rest of the 1960s he continued to exhibit his work in Kassel, Amsterdam, Duisburg, Darmstadt and Wiesbaden. In 1971 he produced a sculpture for the city of Munich and another in 1972 for Darmstadt. Then in 1973 he had a solo exhibition in the Gallerie d'Arte del Naviglio, Milan.

From 1975 to 1997 Fischer was professor at the University of the Arts, Berlin. He continued to exhibit mainly in Germany and Switzerland with one exhibition in New York in 1988 at the Stephen Haller Gallery. He lived and worked in Berlin and in Baierbrunn near Munich until the time of his death. Fischer was awarded the Kunstpreis Rheinland-Pfalz in 1990.
