= Industrial painting =

Artistic movement founded by Gallizio

Industrial Painting is defined by the 1959 "Manifesto of Industrial Painting: For a unitary applied art", a text by Giuseppe Pinot-Gallizio which was originally published in Notizie Arti Figurative No. 9 (1959). A French translation was soon published in Internationale Situationniste no.3 (1959).

In May 1997, Molly Klein translated the original Italian-language version into English:

The machine may very well be the appropriate instrument for the creation of an industrial-inflationist art, based on the Anti-Patent; the new industrial culture will be strictly "Made Amongst People" or not at all! The time of the Scribes is over.

When thousands of painters who today labor at the non-sense of detail will have the possibilities which machines offer, there will be no more giant stamps, called paintings to satisfy the investment of value, but thousands of kilometers of fabric offered in the streets, in markets, for barter, allowing millions of people to enjoy them and exciting the experience of arrangement.

== See also ==
- Anti-art
- Art manifesto
