= Hadj Mohamed Dahou =

Hadj Mohamed Dahou was one of the founders of the Algerian section of the Letterist International which was based in Chlef. Dahou was subsequently a member of the Algerian Section of the Situationist International.

He appears under the pseudonym Midhou in Alexander Trocchi's novel Cain's Book.

== Texts ==
- "Manifesto of the Algerian Group of the Lettrist International", with Cheik Ben Dhine and Ait Diafer, Internationale Lettriste #3, August 1953
- "Principles of a new theatre" (unsigned), Internationale Lettriste #3, August 1953
- "Notes for an appeal to the East", Potlatch #6, 27 July 1954
