= Attila Kotányi =

Hungarian writer and architect

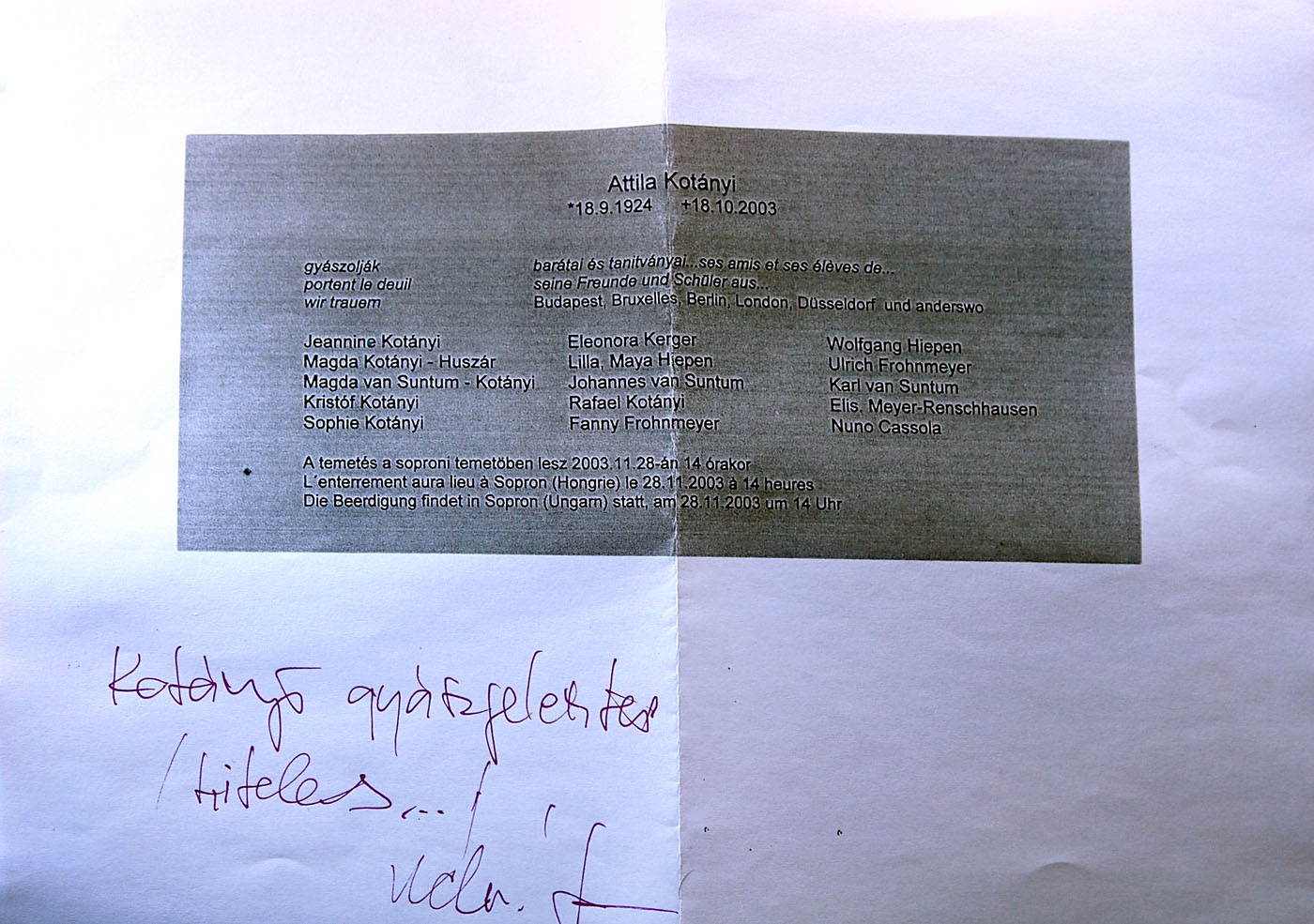
Attila Kotányi's obituary notice

Attila Kotányi (Hungarian: [ˈɒtillɒ ˈkotaːɲi]; 1924 – 18 October 2003) was a poet, philosopher, writer and architect-urbanist.

In his early years in Budapest, Attila Kotányi belonged to the Budapest Dialogical School an intellectual circle of philosopher Lajos Szabó (with whom he maintained a philosophical conversation for 20 years) and Béla Hamvas. In 1956, after the failed Hungarian revolution, he emigrated with his family to Brussels where he continued studying and eventually graduated in urbanism.

In 1960 he became a member of the Situationist International (SI). His contributions to the SI's journal include Gangland and Philosophy (1960), Basic Program of the Bureau of Unitary Urbanism (1961) co-authored with Raoul Vaneigem, and Theses on the Paris Commune (1962) co-authored with Guy Debord and Raoul Vaneigem. He was excluded from the SI in December 1963. Later he moved to Düsseldorf, Germany, where he taught for 12 years at the Düsseldorf Art Academy. Beyond poetry and philosophical conversations he also painted and did smaller architectural works. In the 1990s he returned to Budapest where he pursued the last active period of his life, gathering a steady circle of young intellectuals in his Saturday afternoon conversations where he was elaborating on his Sabbath-theory, the radical suspension of activity. He died in Düsseldorf due to complications of a stroke.
