= Providence Initiative for Psychogeographic Studies =

American artist and psychogeographer collective

Providence Initiative for Psychogeographic Studies (PIPS), sometimes referred to as "People Interested in Participatory Societies", is a small collective of artists in Providence, Rhode Island which promotes artistic and social investigations in psychogeography. PIPS grew out of a small group looking to investigate the urban environment in detail.

== General references ==
- Goldstein, Dana (April 14, 2005). "Providence's Psychogeographic Revolution". The College Hill Independent. Archived from the original on April 27, 2005.
- McQuaid, Cate (April 15, 2005). "All over the map: New technology inspires projects that are redefining the artistic landscape". The Boston Globe. Archived from the original on April 18, 2005.
