= Situationist International =

International organization of social revolutionaries (1957–72)

- Certain founding members of the Situationist International in 1957. From left to right: Giuseppe Pinot-Gallizio, Piero Simondo, Elena Verrone, Michèle Bernstein, Guy Debord, Asger Jorn, and Walter Olmo
- Abbreviation: SI
- Named after: Situation
- Predecessor: International Movement for an Imaginist Bauhaus; Letterist International; London Psychogeographical Association
- Formation: 1957; 69 years ago
- Founders: Guy Debord; Asger Jorn
- Founded at: Cosio di Arroscia
- Dissolved: 1972; 54 years ago
- Merger of: Gruppe SPUR
- Methods: Dérive; Détournement; Situlogy
- De facto leader and theorist: Guy Debord
- Key people: Michèle Bernstein; Jacqueline de Jong; Mustapha Khayati; Pinot Gallizio; Alice Becker-Ho; Attila Kotanyi; Constant Nieuwenhuys; Ralph Rumney; Gianfranco Sanguinetti; Alexander Trocchi; René Viénet
- Publication: Internationale Situationniste
- Secessions: Gruppe SPUR; Nashists; Second Situationist International

The Situationist International (SI) was an international organization of social revolutionaries made up of avant-garde artists, intellectuals, and political theorists. It was prominent in Europe from its formation in 1957 to its dissolution in 1972. The intellectual foundations of the Situationist International were derived primarily from libertarian Marxism and the avant-garde art movements of the early 20th century, particularly Dada and Surrealism. Overall, situationist theory represented an attempt to synthesize this diverse field of theoretical disciplines into a modern and comprehensive critique of mid-20th century advanced capitalism.

Essential to situationist theory was the concept of the spectacle, a unified critique of advanced capitalism of which a primary concern was the progressively increasing tendency towards the expression and mediation of social relations through images. The situationists believed that the shift from individual expression through directly lived experiences, or the first-hand fulfillment of authentic desires, to individual expression by proxy through the exchange or consumption of commodities, or passive second-hand alienation, inflicted significant and far-reaching damage to the quality of human life for both individuals and society. Another important concept of situationist theory was the primary means of counteracting the spectacle; the construction of situations, moments of life deliberately constructed for the purpose of reawakening and pursuing authentic desires, experiencing the feeling of life and adventure, and the liberation of everyday life.

The situationists recognized that capitalism had changed since Karl Marx's formative writings, but maintained that his analysis of the capitalist mode of production remained fundamentally correct; they rearticulated and expanded upon several classical Marxist concepts, such as his theory of alienation. In their expanded interpretation of Marxist theory, the situationists asserted that the misery of social alienation and commodity fetishism were no longer limited to the fundamental components of capitalist society, but had now in advanced capitalism spread themselves to every aspect of life and culture. They rejected the idea that advanced capitalism's apparent successes—such as technological advancement, increased productive capacity, and a raised general quality of life when compared to previous systems, such as feudalism—could ever outweigh the social dysfunction and degradation of everyday life that it simultaneously inflicted.

The Situationist International reached the apex of its creative output and influence in 1967 and 1968, with the former marking the publication of the two most significant texts of the situationist movement, The Society of the Spectacle by Guy Debord and The Revolution of Everyday Life by Raoul Vaneigem. The expressed writing and political theory of the two aforementioned texts, along with other situationist publications, proved greatly influential in shaping the ideas behind the May 1968 insurrections in France; quotes, phrases, and slogans from situationist texts and publications were ubiquitous on posters and graffiti throughout France during the uprisings.

== Etymology and usage ==
The founding manifesto of the Situationist International, Report on the Construction of Situations (1957), defined the construction of situations as "the concrete construction of momentary ambiances of life and their transformation into a superior passional quality." The term "situationist" refers to the construction of situations, one of the early central concepts of the Situationist International; the term also refers to any individuals engaged in the construction of situations, or, more narrowly, to members of the Situationist International. Situationist theory sees the situation as a tool for the liberation of everyday life, a method of negating the pervasive alienation that accompanied the spectacle. Internationale Situationniste No. 1 (June 1958) defined the constructed situation as "a moment of life concretely and deliberately constructed by the collective organization of a unitary ambiance and a game of events". The situationists argued that advanced capitalism manufactured false desires; literally in the sense of ubiquitous advertising and the glorification of accumulated capital, and more broadly in the abstraction and reification of the more ephemeral experiences of authentic life into commodities. The experimental direction of situationist activity consisted of setting up temporary environments favorable to the fulfillment of true and authentic human desires in response.

The Situationist International strongly resisted use of the term "situationism", which Debord called a "meaningless term", adding "[t]here is no such thing as situationism, which would mean a doctrine for interpreting existing conditions". The situationists maintained a philosophical opposition to all ideologies, conceiving of them as abstract superstructures ultimately serving only to justify the economic base of a given society; accordingly, they rejected "situationism" as an absurd and self-contradictory concept. In The Society of the Spectacle, Debord asserted that ideology was "the abstract will to universality and the illusion thereof" which was "legitimated in modern society by universal abstraction and by the effective dictatorship of illusion".

== History ==
=== Origins (1945–1955) ===
The situationist movement had its origins as a left wing tendency within Lettrism, an artistic and literary movement led by the Romanian-born French poet and visual artist Isidore Isou, originating in 1940s Paris. The group was heavily influenced by the preceding avant-garde movements of Dadaism and Surrealism, seeking to apply critical theories based on these concepts to all areas of art and culture, most notably in poetry, film, painting and political theory.

Among some of the concepts and artistic innovations developed by the Lettrists were the lettrie (a poem reflecting pure form yet devoid of all semantic content), new syntheses of writing and visual art known as metagraphics and hypergraphics, as well as new creative techniques in filmmaking. Future situationist Guy Debord, who was at that time a significant figure in the Lettrist movement, helped develop these new film techniques, using them in his Lettrist film Howlings for Sade (1952) as well as later in his situationist film Society of the Spectacle (1972). By 1950, a much younger and more left-wing part of the Lettrist movement began to emerge. This group kept very active in perpetrating public outrages such as the Notre-Dame Affair, where at the Easter High Mass at Notre Dame de Paris, in front of ten thousand people and broadcast on national TV, their member and former Dominican Michel Mourre posed as a monk, "stood in front of the altar and read a pamphlet proclaiming that God was dead". André Breton prominently came out in support of the action in a letter that spawned a large debate in the newspaper Combat.

In 1952, this left wing of the Lettrist movement, which included Debord, broke off from Isou's group and formed the Letterist International, a new Paris-based collective of avant-garde artists and political theorists. The schism finally erupted when the future members of the radical Lettrists disrupted a Charlie Chaplin press conference for Limelight at the Hôtel Ritz Paris. They distributed a polemic entitled "No More Flat Feet!", which concluded: "The footlights have melted the make-up of the supposedly brilliant mime. All we can see now is a lugubrious and mercenary old man. Go home Mister Chaplin." Isou was upset with this, his own attitude being that Chaplin deserved respect as one of the great creators of the cinematic art. The breakaway group felt that his work was no longer relevant, while having appreciated it "in its own time", and asserted their belief "that the most urgent expression of freedom is the destruction of idols, especially when they claim to represent freedom", in this case filmmaker Charlie Chaplin.

During this period of the Letterist International, many of the important concepts and ideas that would later be integral in situationist theory were developed. Individuals in the group collaboratively constructed the new field of psychogeography, which they defined as "the study of the specific effects of the geographical environment (whether consciously organized or not) on the emotions and behavior of individuals." Debord further expanded this concept of psychogeography with his theory of the dérive, an unplanned tour through an urban landscape directed entirely by the feelings evoked in the individual by their surroundings, serving as the primary means for mapping and investigating the psychogeography of these different areas. During this period the Letterist International also developed the situationist tactic of détournement, which by reworking or re-contextualizing an existing work of art or literature sought to radically shift its meaning to one with revolutionary significance.

=== Formation (1956–1957) ===
In 1956, Guy Debord, a member of the Lettrist International, and Asger Jorn of the International Movement for an Imaginist Bauhaus, brought together a group of artistic collectives for the First World Congress of Free Artists in Alba, Italy. The meeting established the foundation for the development of the Situationist International, which was officially formed in July 1957 at a meeting in Cosio di Arroscia, Italy. The resulting International was a fusion of these extremely small avant-garde collectives: the Lettrist International, the International Movement for an Imaginist Bauhaus (an offshoot of COBRA), and the London Psychogeographical Association, although Anselm Jappe has argued that the group pivoted around Jorn and Debord for the first four years. Later, the Situationist International drew ideas from other groups such as Socialisme ou Barbarie.

The most prominent member of the group, Guy Debord, generally became considered the organization's de facto leader and most distinguished theorist. Other members included theorist Raoul Vaneigem, the Dutch painter Constant Nieuwenhuys, the Italo-Scottish writer Alexander Trocchi, the English artist Ralph Rumney (sole member of the London Psychogeographical Association, Rumney suffered expulsion relatively soon after the formation), the Danish artist Asger Jorn (who after parting with the SI also founded the Scandinavian Institute of Comparative Vandalism), the architect and veteran of the Hungarian Uprising Attila Kotanyi, and the French writer Michèle Bernstein. Debord and Bernstein later married. In June 1957, Debord wrote the manifesto of the Situationist International, titled Report on the Construction of Situations. This manifesto plans a rereading of Karl Marx's Das Kapital and advocates a cultural revolution in western countries.

=== Artistic period (1958–1962) ===
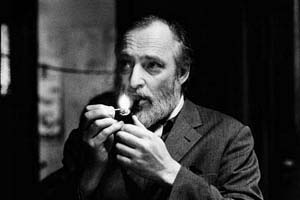
Danish painter, sculptor, ceramic artist, and author Asger Jorn, founding member of the Situationist International.

During the first few years of the SI's founding, avant-garde artistic groups began collaborating with the SI and joining the organization. Gruppe SPUR, a German artistic collective, collaborated with the Situationist International on projects beginning in 1959, continuing until the group officially joined the SI in 1961. The role of the artists in the SI was of great significance, particularly Asger Jorn, Constant Nieuwenhuys and Pinot Gallizio.

Asger Jorn, who invented Situgraphy and Situlogy, had the social role of catalyst and team leader among the members of the SI between 1957 and 1961. Guy Debord on his own lacked the personal warmth and persuasiveness to draw people of different nationalities and talents into an active working partnership. As a prototype Marxist intellectual Debord needed an ally who could patch up the petty egoisms and squabbles of the members. When Jorn's leadership was withdrawn in 1961, many simmering quarrels among different sections of the SI flared up, leading to multiple exclusions. The first major split was the exclusion of Gruppe SPUR, the German section, from the SI on 10 February 1962.

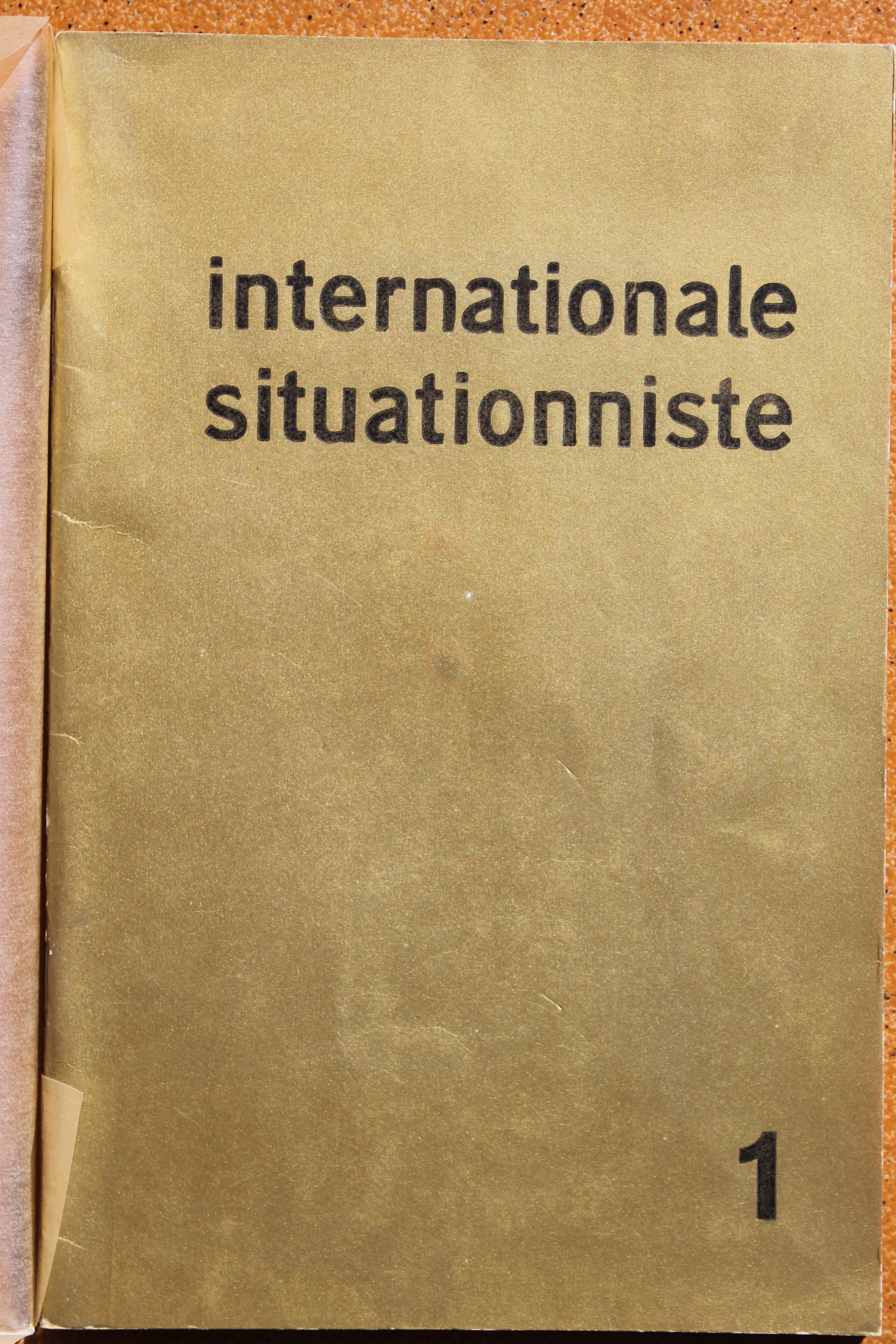
Internationale situationniste

Many different disagreements led to the fracture, for example; while at the Fourth SI Conference in London in December 1960, in a discussion about the political nature of the SI, the Gruppe SPUR members disagreed with the core situationist stance of counting on a revolutionary proletariat; the accusation that their activities were based on a "systematic misunderstanding of situationist theses"; the understanding that at least one Gruppe SPUR member, sculptor Lothar Fischer, and possibly the rest of the group, were not actually understanding and/or agreeing with the situationist ideas, but were just using the SI to achieve success in the art market; and the betrayal, in the Spur #7 issue, of a common agreement on the Gruppe SPUR and SI publications.

The exclusion was a recognition that Gruppe SPUR's "principles, methods and goals" were significantly in contrast with those of the SI. This split however was not a declaration of hostilities, as in other cases of SI exclusions. A few months after the exclusion, in the context of judicial prosecution against the group by the German state, Debord expressed his esteem to Gruppe SPUR, calling it the only significant artist group in (Germany) since World War II, and regarding it at the level of the avant-gardes in other countries. The next significant split was in 1962, wherein the "Nashists", the Scandinavian section of the SI led by Jørgen Nash, were excluded from the organization. Nash created the 2nd Situationist International.

=== Political period (1963–1968) ===
By this point, the Situationist International consisted almost exclusively of the Franco-Belgian section, led by Guy Debord and Raoul Vaneigem. These members possessed much more of a tendency towards political theory over the more artistic aspects of the SI. The shift in the intellectual priorities within the SI resulted in more focus on the theoretical, such as the theory of the spectacle and Marxist critical analysis, spending much less time on the more artistic and tangible concepts like unitary urbanism, détournement, and situgraphy.

During this period, the SI began having more and more influence on local university students in France. Taking advantage of the apathy of their colleagues, five "Pro-situs", situationist-influenced students, infiltrated the University of Strasbourg's student union in November 1966 and began scandalising the authorities. Their first action was to form an "anarchist appreciation society" called The Society for the Rehabilitation for Karl Marx and Ravachol; next they appropriated union funds to flypost "Return of the Durruti Column", André Bertrand's détourned comic strip. They then invited the situationists to contribute a critique of the University of Strasbourg, and On the Poverty of Student Life, written by Tunisian situationist Mustapha/Omar Khayati was the result. The students promptly proceeded to print 10,000 copies of the pamphlet using university funds and distributed them during a ceremony marking the beginning of the academic year. This provoked an immediate outcry in the local, national and international media.

=== May events (1968) ===
The Situationists played a preponderant role in the May 1968 uprisings, and to some extent their political perspective and ideas fueled such crisis, providing a central theoretical foundation. While SI's member count had been steadily falling for the preceding several years, the ones that remained were able to fill revolutionary roles for which they had patiently anticipated and prepared. The active ideologists ("enragés" and Situationists) behind the revolutionary events in Strasbourg, Nanterre and Paris, numbered only about one or two dozen persons. This has now been widely acknowledged as a fact by studies of the period, what is still wide open to interpretation is the "how and why" that happened. Charles de Gaulle, in the aftermath televised speech of 7 June, acknowledged: "This explosion was provoked by groups in revolt against modern consumer and technical society, whether it be the communism of the East or the capitalism of the West."

The Situationists made up the majority in the Occupation Committee of the Sorbonne. An important event leading up to May 1968 was the scandal in Strasbourg in December 1966. The Union Nationale des Étudiants de France declared itself in favor of the SI's theses, and managed to use public funds to publish Mustapha Khayati's pamphlet On the Poverty of Student Life. Thousands of copies of the pamphlet were printed and circulated and helped to make the Situationists well known throughout the nonstalinist left.

Quotations from two key situationist books, Debord's The Society of the Spectacle (1967) and Khayati's On the Poverty of Student Life (1966), were written on the walls of Paris and several provincial cities. This was documented in the collection of photographs published in 1968 by Walter Lewino, L'imagination au pouvoir. Though the SI were a very small group, they were expert self-propagandists, and their slogans appeared daubed on walls throughout Paris at the time of the revolt. SI member René Viénet's 1968 book Enragés and Situationists in the Occupations Movement, France, May '68 gives an account of the involvement of the SI with the student group of Enragés and the occupation of the Sorbonne.

The occupations of 1968 started at the University of Nanterre and spread to the Sorbonne. The police tried to take back the Sorbonne and a riot ensued. Following this a general strike was declared with up to 10 million workers participating. The SI originally participated in the Sorbonne occupations and defended barricades in the riots. The SI distributed calls for the occupation of factories and the formation of workers' councils, but, disillusioned with the students, left the university to set up the Council for Maintaining the Occupations (CMDO) which distributed the SI's demands on a much wider scale. After the end of the movement, the CMDO disbanded.

=== Aftermath (1968–1972) ===
By 1972, Gianfranco Sanguinetti and Guy Debord were the only two remaining members of the SI. Working with Debord, in August 1975, Sanguinetti wrote a pamphlet titled Rapporto veridico sulle ultime opportunità di salvare il capitalismo in Italia (The Real Report on the Last Chance to Save Capitalism in Italy), which (inspired by Bruno Bauer) purported to be the cynical writing of "Censor", a powerful industrialist. The pamphlet argued that the ruling class of Italy supported the Piazza Fontana bombing and other covert, false flag mass slaughter for the higher goal of defending the capitalist status quo from communist influence. The pamphlet was mailed to 520 of Italy's most powerful individuals. It was received as genuine and powerful politicians, industrialists and journalists praised its content. After reprinting the tract as a small book, Sanguinetti revealed himself to be the true author. In the outcry that ensued, and under pressure from Italian authorities, Sanguinetti left Italy in February 1976, and was denied entry to France. After publishing in the last issue of the magazine, an analysis of the May 1968 revolts and the strategies that will need to be adopted in future revolutions, the SI was dissolved in 1972.

== Main concepts ==
=== The spectacle and its society ===
The Spectacle is a central notion in situationist theory, developed by Guy Debord in his 1967 book The Society of the Spectacle. In a limited sense, spectacle includes the mass media, which are "its most glaring superficial manifestation." Debord said that the society of the spectacle came to existence in the late 1920s. The critique of the spectacle is a development and application of Karl Marx's concept of fetishism of commodities, reification and alienation, and the way it was reprised by György Lukács in 1923. In the society of the spectacle, the commodities rule the workers and the consumers instead of being ruled by them. The consumers are passive subjects that contemplate the reified spectacle. As early as 1958, in the situationist manifesto, Debord described official culture as a "rigged game", where conservative powers forbid subversive ideas to have direct access to the public discourse. Such ideas get first trivialized and sterilized, and then they are safely incorporated back within mainstream society, where they can be exploited to add new flavors to old dominant ideas. This technique of the spectacle is sometimes called recuperation, and its counter-technique is the détournement.

=== Détournement ===
A détournement is a technique developed in the 1950s by the Letterist International, and consist in "turning expressions of the capitalist system against itself," like turning slogans and logos against the advertisers or the political status quo. Détournement was prominently used to set up subversive political pranks, an influential tactic called situationist prank that was reprised by the punk movement in the late 1970s and inspired the culture jamming movement in the late 1980s.

=== Anti-capitalism ===
The Situationist International, in the 15 years from its formation in 1957 and its dissolution in 1972, is characterized by a Marxist and surrealist perspective on aesthetics and politics, without separation between the two: art and politics are faced together and in revolutionary terms. The SI analyzed the modern world from the point of view of everyday life. The core arguments of the Situationist International were an attack on the capitalist degradation of the life of people, as well as the fake models advertised by the mass media, to which the Situationist responded with alternative life experiences. The alternative life experiences explored by the Situationists were the construction of situations, unitary urbanism, psychogeography, and the union of play, freedom and critical thinking. A major stance of the SI was to count on the force of a revolutionary proletariat. The SI remarked that this is a core Situationist principle, and that those that do not understand it and agree with it, are not Situationist. This stance was reaffirmed very clearly in a discussion on "To what extent is the SI a political movement?" during the Fourth SI Conference in London.

=== Art and politics ===
The SI rejected all art that separated itself from politics, the concept of 20th-century art that is separated from topical political events. The SI believed that the notion of artistic expression being separated from politics and current events is one proliferated by reactionary considerations to render artwork that expresses comprehensive critiques of society impotent. They recognized there was a precise mechanism followed by reactionaries to defuse the role of subversive artists and intellectuals, that is, to reframe them as separated from the most topical events, and divert from them the taste for the new that may dangerously appeal the masses; after such separation, such artworks are sterilized, banalized, degraded, and can be safely integrated into the official culture and the public discourse, where they can add new flavors to old dominant ideas and play the role of a gear wheel in the mechanism of the society of the spectacle.

According to this theory, artists and intellectuals that accept such compromises are rewarded by the art dealers and praised by the dominant culture. The SI received many offers to sponsor "creations" that would just have a "situationist" label but a diluted political content, that would have brought things back to order and the SI back into the old fold of artistic praxis. The majority of SI continued to refuse such offers and any involvement on the conventional avant-garde artistic plane. This principle was affirmed since the founding of the SI in 1957, but the qualitative step of resolving all the contradictions of having situationists that make concessions to the cultural market, was made with the exclusion of Gruppe SPUR in 1962. The SI noted how reactionary forces forbid subversive ideas from artists and intellectuals to reach the public discourse, and how they attack the artworks that express comprehensive critique of society, by saying that art should not involve itself into politics.

=== The construction of situations ===
The first edition of Internationale Situationniste defines the constructed situation as "a moment of life concretely and deliberately constructed by the collective organization of a unitary ambiance and a game of events." As the SI embraced dialectical Marxism, the situation came to refer less to a specific avant-garde practice than to the dialectical unification of art and life more generally. Beyond this theoretical definition, the situation as a practical manifestation thus slipped between a series of proposals. The SI thus were first led to distinguish the situation from the mere artistic practice of the happening, and later identified it in historical events such as the Paris Commune in which it exhibited itself as the revolutionary moment. The SI's interest in the Paris Commune was expressed in 1962 in their fourteen "Theses on the Paris Commune".

=== Psychogeography ===
The first edition of Internationale Situationniste defined psychogeography as "the study of the specific effects of the geographical environment (whether consciously organized or not) on the emotions and behavior of individuals." The term was first recognized in 1955 by Guy Debord while still with the Letterist International:

The word psychogeography, suggested by an illiterate Kabyle as a general term for the phenomena a few of us were investigating around the summer of 1953, is not too inappropriate. It does not contradict the materialist perspective of the conditioning of life and thought by objective nature. Geography, for example, deals with the determinant action of general natural forces, such as soil composition or climatic conditions, on the economic structures of a society, and thus on the corresponding conception that such a society can have of the world. Psychogeography could set for itself the study of the precise laws and specific effects of the geographical environment, whether consciously organized or not, on the emotions and behavior of individuals. The charmingly vague adjective psychogeographical can be applied to the findings arrived at by this type of investigation, to their influence on human feelings, and more generally to any situation or conduct that seems to reflect the same spirit of discovery.

==== Dérive ====
By definition, psychogeography combines subjective and objective knowledge and studies. Debord struggled to stipulate the finer points of this theoretical paradox, ultimately producing "Theory of the Dérive" in 1958, a document which essentially serves as an instruction manual for the psychogeographic procedure, executed through the act of dérive ("drift").

In a dérive one or more persons during a certain period drop their usual motives for movement and action, their relations, their work and leisure activities, and let themselves be drawn by the attractions of the terrain and the encounters they find there... But the dérive includes both this letting go and its necessary contradiction: the domination of psychogeographical variations by the knowledge and calculation of their possibilities.

— Ken Knabb

SI engaged in a play-form that was also practiced by its predecessor organization, the Lettrist International, the art of wandering through urban space, which they termed dérive, whose unique mood is conveyed in Debord's darkly romantic meaning of palindrome. Two excursions organized by Andre Breton serve as the closest cultural precedents to the dérive. The first in 1921, was an excursion to the Church of Saint-Julien-le-Pauvre with the Parisian Dadaists; the second excursion was on 1 May 1923, when a small group of Surrealists walked toward the countryside outside of Blois. Debord was cautious however to differentiate between the derive and such precedents. He emphasized its active character as "a mode of experimental behavior" that reached to Romanticism, the Baroque, and the age of chivalry, with its tradition of long adventures voyages. Such urban roaming was characteristic of Left Bank bohemianism in Paris.

In the SI's 6th issue, Raoul Vaneigem writes in a manifesto of unitary urbanism, "All space is occupied by the enemy. We are living under a permanent curfew. Not just the cops—the geometry". Dérive, as a previously conceptualized tactic in the French military, was "a calculated action determined by the absence of a greater locus", and "a maneuver within the enemy's field of vision". To the SI, whose interest was inhabiting space, the dérive brought appeal in this sense of taking the "fight" to the streets and truly indulging in a determined operation. The dérive was a course of preparation, reconnaissance, a means of shaping situationist psychology among urban explorers for the eventuality of the situationist city.

== Political theory ==
=== Major works ===
Twelve issues of the main French edition of journal Internationale Situationniste were published. Each issue was edited by a different individual or group, including: Guy Debord, Hadj Mohamed Dahou, Giuseppe Pinot-Gallizio, Maurice Wyckaert, Constant Nieuwenhuys, Asger Jorn, Helmut Sturm, Attila Kotanyi, Jørgen Nash, Uwe Lausen, Raoul Vaneigem, Michèle Bernstein, Jeppesen Victor Martin, Jan Strijbosch, Alexander Trocchi, Théo Frey, Mustapha Khayati, Donald Nicholson-Smith, René Riesel, and René Viénet.

Classic Situationist texts include: On the Poverty of Student Life, Society of the Spectacle by Guy Debord, and The Revolution of Everyday Life by Raoul Vaneigem. The first English-language collection of SI writings, although poorly and freely translated, was Leaving The 20th century edited by Christopher Gray. The Situationist International Anthology edited and translated by Ken Knabb, collected numerous SI documents which had previously never been seen in English.

=== Relationship with Marxism ===
Rooted firmly in the Marxist tradition, the Situationist International criticized Trotskyism, Marxism–Leninism, Stalinism and Maoism from a position they believed to be further left and more properly Marxist. The situationists possessed a strong anti-authoritarian current, commonly deriding the centralized bureaucracies of China and the Soviet Union in the same breath as capitalism. Debord's work The Society of the Spectacle (1967) established situationist analysis as Marxist critical theory. The Society of the Spectacle is widely recognized as the main and most influential Situationist essay. The concept of revolution created by the Situationist International was anti-capitalist, Marxist, Young Hegelian, and from the very beginning in the 1950s also remarkably different from the established anti-Stalinist left and against all repressive regimes.

Debord starts his 1967 work with a revisited version of the first sentence with which Marx began his critique of classical political economy, Das Kapital. In a later essay, Debord will argue that his work was the most important social critique since Marx's work. Drawing from Marx, which argued that under a capitalist society the wealth is degraded to an immense accumulation of commodities, Debord argues that in advanced capitalism, life is reduced to an immense accumulation of spectacles, a triumph of mere appearance where "all that once was directly lived has become mere representation". The spectacle, which according to Debord is the core feature of the advanced capitalist societies, has its "most glaring superficial manifestation" in the advertising-mass media-marketing complex. Elaborating on Marx's argument that under capitalism our lives and our environment are continually depleted, Debord adds that the Spectacle is the system by which capitalism tries to hide such depletion. Debord added that, further than the impoverishment in the quality of life, our psychic functions are altered, we get a degradation of mind and also a degradation of knowledge.

In the spectacular society, knowledge is not used anymore to question, analyze, or resolve contradictions, but to assuage reality. Situationist theorists advocated methods of operation that included democratic workers' councils and workers' self-management, interested in empowering the individual, in contrast to the perceived corrupt bureaucratic states of the Eastern bloc. Their anti-authoritarian interpretation of Marxist theory can be identified with the broader council communist and libertarian Marxist movements, themselves more broadly termed as left communism. The last issue (1969) of the Situationist International journal, featured an editorial analyzing the events of May 1968. The editorial, written by Guy Debord, was titled The Beginning of an Era, probably as a détournement reference of Nachalo (The Beginning), a Russian Marxist monthly magazine. According to Greil Marcus, some found similarities between the Situationists and the Yippies. Former situationists T. J. Clark and Donald Nicholson-Smith (British section), argued that the portion of the moderate Left that is the "established Left", and its "Left opinion-makers", usually addressed contemptuously the SI as "hopelessly young-Hegelian".

=== Relationship with anarchism ===
The Situationist International was differentiated from both anarchists and Marxists. In spite of this, they have frequently been associated with anarchism. Debord did a critical assessment of the anarchists in his 1967 The Society of the Spectacle. In the final, 12th issue of the journal, the situationists rejected spontaneism and the "mystics of nonorganization," labeling them as a form of "sub-anarchism":

The only people who will be excluded from this debate are... those who in the name of some sub-anarchist spontaneism proclaim their opposition to any form of organization, and who only reproduce the defects and confusion of the old movement—mystics of nonorganization, workers discouraged by having been mixed up with Trotskyist sects too long, students imprisoned in their impoverishment who are incapable of escaping from bolshevik organizational schemas. The situationists are obviously partisans of organization—the existence of the situationist organization testifies to that. Those who announce their agreement with our theses while crediting the SI with a vague spontaneism simply don't know how to read.

According to situationist Ken Knabb, Debord pointed out the flaws and merits of both Marxism and anarchism. He argued that "the split between Marxism and anarchism crippled both sides. The anarchists rightly criticized the authoritarian and narrowly economistic tendencies in Marxism, but they generally did so in an undialectical, moralistic, ahistorical manner... and leaving Marx and a few of the more radical Marxists with a virtual monopoly on coherent dialectical analysis—until the situationists finally brought the libertarian and dialectical aspects back together again."

=== Relationship with the established left ===
The SI poses a challenge to the model of political action of a portion of the left, the "established Left" and "Left opinion-makers". The first challenging aspect is the fueling role that the SI had in the upheavals of the political and social movements of the 1960s, upheavals for which much is still at stake and which many foresee as recurring in the 21st century. The second challenging aspect, is the comparison between the Situationist Marxist theory of the Society of the Spectacle, which is still very topical 30 years later, and the current status of the theories supported by leftist establishments in the same period, like Althusserianism, Maoism, Autonomism, Freudo-Marxism and others.

The response to this challenge has been an attempt to silence and misinterpret, to "turn the SI safely into an art movement, and thereby to minimize its role in the political and social movements of the sixties". The core aspect of the revolutionary perspectives, and the political theory, of the Situationist International, has been neglected by some commentators, which either limited themselves to an apolitical reading of the situationist avant-garde art works, or dismissed the Situationist political theory. Examples of this are Simon Sadler's The Situationist City, and the accounts on the SI published by the New Left Review.

The concept of revolution created by the Situationist International was anti-capitalist, Marxist, Young Hegelian, and from the very beginning in the 1950s also remarkably differently from the established anti-Stalinist left and against all repressive regimes. The SI called in May 1968 for the formation of workers' councils. There was no separation between the artistic and the political perspectives. For instance, Asger Jorn never believed in a conception of the Situationist ideas as exclusively artistic and separated from political involvement. He was at the root and at the core of the Situationist International project, fully sharing the revolutionary intentions with Debord.

== Reception ==
=== Criticism ===
Critics of the Situationists frequently assert that their ideas are not in fact complex and difficult to understand, but are at best simple ideas expressed in deliberately difficult language, and at worst actually nonsensical. For example, anarchist Chaz Bufe asserts in Listen Anarchist! that "obscure situationist jargon" is a major problem in the anarchist movement. Andrea Gibbons argues that the Parisian situationists failed to take on board practically or theoretically the experience of their African members, such as is shown by Abdelhafid Khattib's experience of police harassment while conducting psychogeographic research on Les Halles in 1958. She remarks how little the suppression of Algerians in Paris had impacted their activity and thinking – Bernstein and Debord co-signed the Declaration on the Right to Insubordination in the Algerian War in 1961, which led to them being questioned by the police. She cites a letter written by Jacqueline de Jong, Jorgen Nash, and Ansgar Elde protesting the expulsion of the Spur group in 1962 which highlights the political repression in Paris at that time. Gibbons also criticises the lack of mention of the Algerian situationists in either Debord's or Vaneigem's memoirs.

=== Influence ===
Debord's analysis of the spectacle has been influential among people working on television, particularly in France and Italy; in Italy, TV programs produced by situationist intellectuals, like Antonio Ricci's Striscia la notizia, or Carlo Freccero's programming schedule for Italia 1 in the early 1990s. In the 1960s and 1970s, anarchists, communists, and other leftists offered various interpretations of Situationist concepts in combination with a variety of other perspectives. Examples of these groups include: in Amsterdam, the Provos; in the UK, King Mob, the producers of Heatwave magazine (including Charles Radcliffe who later briefly joined the English Section of the Situationist International), and the Angry Brigade. In the US, groups like Black Mask (later Up Against the Wall Motherfuckers), The Weathermen, and the Rebel Worker group also explicitly employed their ideas.

Anarchist theorists such as Fredy Perlman, Bob Black, Hakim Bey, and John Zerzan, have developed the SI's ideas in various directions away from Marxism. These theorists were predominantly associated with the magazines Fifth Estate, Anarchy: A Journal of Desire Armed, and Green Anarchy. During the early 1980s, English anarchist Larry Law produced the Spectacular Times pocket-books series, which aimed to make Situationist ideas more easily assimilated into the anarchist movement. Later anarchist theorists such as the CrimethInc. collective also claim Situationist influence.

Situationist urban theory, defined initially by the members of the Lettrist International as "Unitary Urbanism," was extensively developed through the behavioural and performance structures of The Workshop for Non-Linear Architecture during the 1990s. The re-emergence of the London Psychogeographical Association also inspired many new psychogeographical groups including Manchester Area Psychogeographic. The LPA and the Neoist Alliance along with the Luther Blissett Project came together to form a New Lettrist International with a specifically communist perspective. Around this time, Unpopular Books and the LPA released some key texts including new translations of Asger Jorn's work. Around this time groups such as Reclaim the Streets and Adbusters respectively saw themselves as "creating situations" or practicing detournement on advertisements.

== Punk and culture ==
In cultural terms, Situationist International's influence has arguably been greater, if more diffuse. In the late 1960s, MC5, the Fugs and Hawkwind were radical situationist bands. Situationist ideas exerted a strong influence on the design language of the punk rock phenomenon of the 1970s and the post-punk scene of the early 1980s. To a significant extent, this was the result of the adoption of the style, aesthetics and slogans employed by the SI. These were often secondhand influences received through British situationist groups such as King Mob whose associates included Malcolm McLaren and Jamie Reid. Factory Records owner Tony Wilson was influenced by situationist urbanism, and Factory band the Durutti Column took their name from André Bertrand's collage Le Retour de la Colonne Durutti.

In turn, Bertrand took his title from the eponymous anarchist army during the Spanish Civil War). American punk group the Feederz have been acclaimed as exhibiting a more direct and conscious influence. Formed in the late 1970s, they became known for extensive use of detournement and their intention to provoke their audience through the exposition of situationist themes. Other musical artists whose lyrics and artwork have referenced situationist concepts include the Clash, Pussy Riot, Crass, Tom Robinson Band, Ian Dury, X-Ray Spex, Sham 69, Buzzcocks, the Fall, Patrik Fitzgerald, Gang of Four, Conflict, the Royal Family and the Poor, Angelic Upstarts, Chaos UK, Chaotic Dischord, MDC, Dead Kennedys, Reagan Youth, Chumbawamba and Manic Street Preachers. Situationist theory experienced a vogue in the late '90s hardcore punk scene, when it was referenced by Orchid, His Hero Is Gone and CrimethInc.

Situationist ideas may be found within the development of other avant-garde threads such as neoism, as well as artists such as Mark Divo and American artist Joey Skaggs who has been compared to Situationist practitioners for his use of staged spectacles and media infiltration to subvert dominant cultural narratives. His satirical hoaxes, such as Cathouse for Dogs and Portofess, reflect Situationist strategies like détournement by exposing media complicity and challenging societal norms. Writers such as Thomas de Zengotita have echoed situationist theories regarding the spectacle of contemporary society.

== See also ==
- Anti-art
- Arsenale Institute for Politics of Representation, an international institution for cultural studies and philosophical research, which archives contains an extensive research collection of the avant-garde movements of the early 20th century, with a focus on documents and works by Situationists, among others
- Bernadette Corporation
- Golden Fleet
- King Mob
- The Right to Be Greedy: Theses on the Practical Necessity of Demanding Everything
- Neoism
