= The Society of the Spectacle =

1967 book by Guy Debord

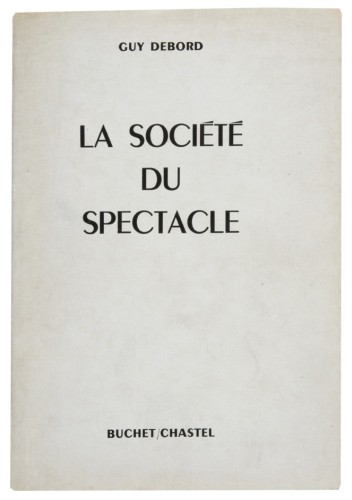
- Cover of the first edition
- Author: Guy Debord
- Original title: La société du spectacle
- Translator: Donald Nicholson-Smith
- Language: French
- Subject: Spectacle
- Published: 1967 (Buchet-Chastel, in French); 1970 (Black & Red, in English)
- Publication place: France
- Media type: Print (Hardcover, Paperback)
- Pages: 154 (1994 Zone Books edition)
- ISBN: 0-942299-79-5 (1994 Zone Books edition)

The Society of the Spectacle (French: La société du spectacle) is a 1967 work of philosophy and Marxist critical theory by Guy Debord where he develops and presents the concept of the Spectacle. The book is considered a seminal text for the Situationist movement. In 1974, Debord made a film of the same name, and in 1988, he published a follow-up book titled Comments on the Society of the Spectacle.

== Summary ==
The work is a series of 221 short theses—each containing one paragraph—in the form of aphorisms.

=== Degradation of human life ===
Debord traces the development of a modern society in which authentic social life has been replaced with its representation: "All that once was directly lived has become mere representation." Debord argues that the history of social life can be understood as "the decline of being into having, and having into merely appearing." This condition, according to Debord, is the "historical moment at which the commodity completes its colonization of social life."

The spectacle is the inverted image of society in which relations between commodities have supplanted relations between people, in which "passive identification with the spectacle supplants genuine activity". "The spectacle is not a collection of images," Debord writes, "rather, it is a social relation among people, mediated by images."

In his analysis of the spectacular society, Debord notes that the quality of life is impoverished, with such a lack of authenticity that human perceptions are affected; and an attendant degradation of knowledge, which in turn hinders critical thought. Debord analyzes the use of knowledge to assuage reality: the spectacle obfuscates the past, imploding it with the future into an undifferentiated mass, a type of never-ending present. In this way, the spectacle prevents individuals from realizing that the society of spectacle is only a moment in history, one that can be overturned through revolution.

In the Situationist view, situations are actively constructed and characterized by "a sense of self-consciousness of existence within a particular environment or ambience".

Debord encouraged the use of détournement, "which involves using spectacular images and language to disrupt the flow of the spectacle."

=== Mass media and commodity fetishism ===
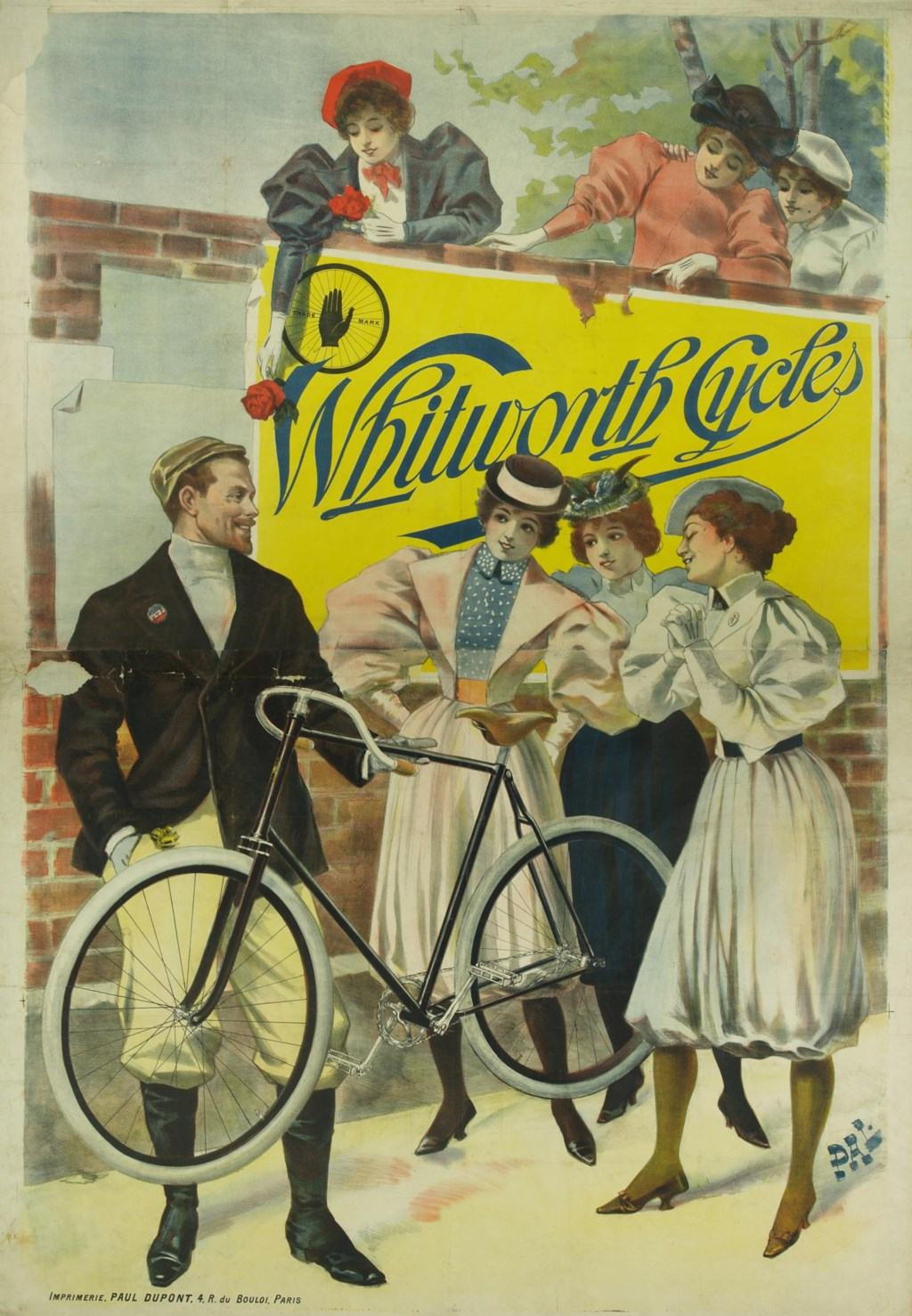
Spectacular advertising depicts not only the commodity but also a world centered on its appreciation.

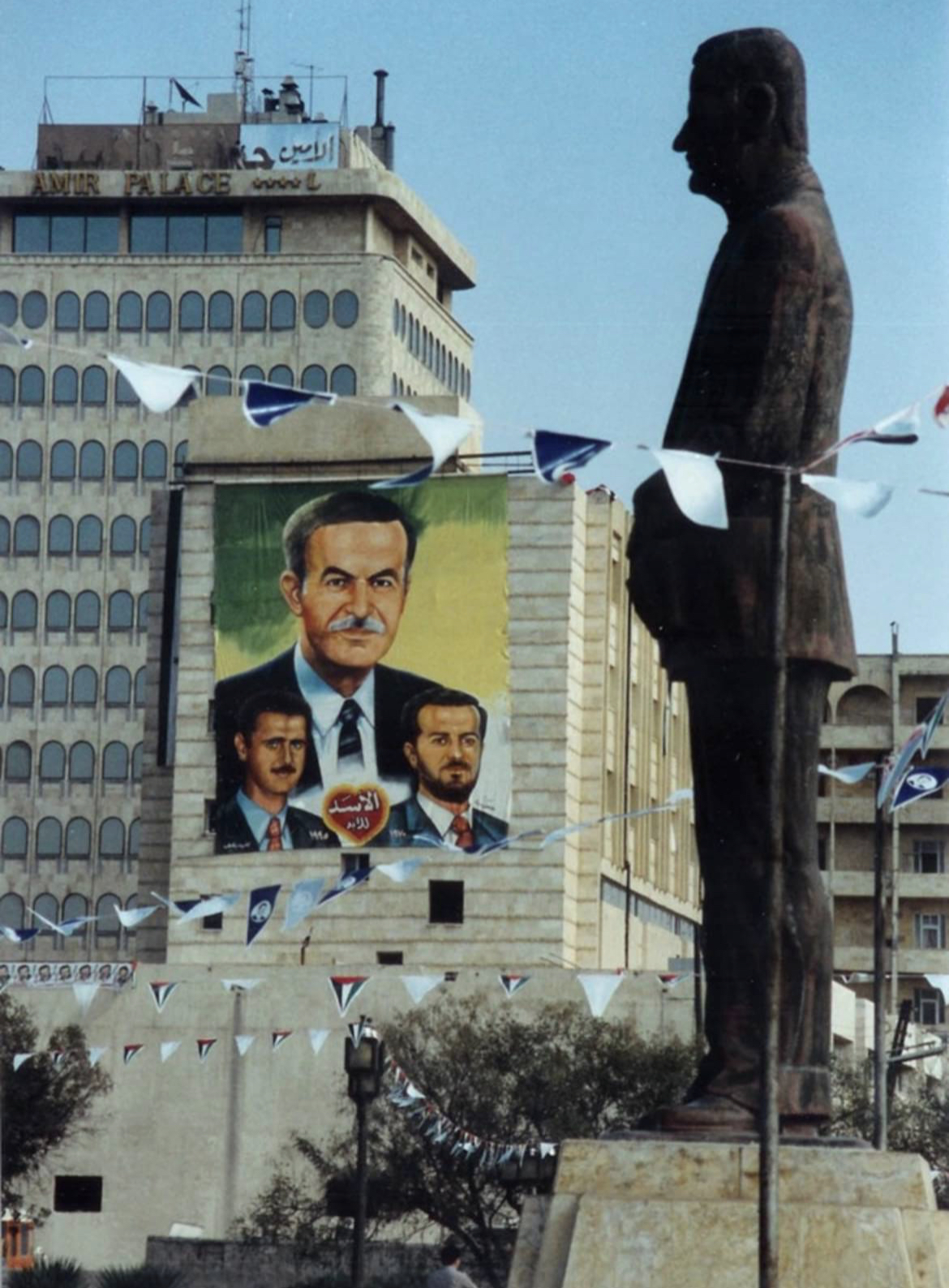
Debord saw the spectacular celebration of commodities as a sophisticated counterpart to the propaganda of bureaucratic systems.

The Society of the Spectacle is a critique of contemporary consumer culture and commodity fetishism, dealing with issues such as class alienation, cultural homogenization, and mass media. When Debord says that "all that was once directly lived has become mere representation," he is referring to the central importance of the image in contemporary society. Images, Debord says, have supplanted genuine human interaction. Thus, Debord's fourth thesis is: "The spectacle is not a collection of images; rather, it is a social relationship between people that is mediated by images." In a consumer society, fulfillment is pursued not by improving one's self but by having commodities. The spectacle shifts the emphasis from having to appearing. People no longer live for themselves, but to simulate a life that is shown to them. Debord states that the spectacle cannot be understood as a distinct illusion contrasted with a distinct reality, since the spectacle is produced by and informs reality. Where Hegel believed that the false is a moment of (i.e. expressed in) the true, he counters that the spectacle turns this upside-down; the true is expressed in the false.

=== Comparison between religion and marketing ===
Debord also draws an equivalence between the role of mass media marketing in the present and the role of religions in the past. The spread of commodity-images by the mass media, produces "waves of enthusiasm for a given product" resulting in "moments of fervent exaltation similar to the ecstasies of the convulsions and miracles of the old religious fetishism".

Debord contends further that "the remains of religion and of the family (the principal relic of the heritage of class power) and the moral repression they assure, merge whenever the enjoyment of this world is affirmed–this world being nothing other than repressive pseudo-enjoyment." "The monotheistic religions were a compromise between myth and history. ... These religions arose on the soil of history, and established themselves there. But there they still preserve themselves in radical opposition to history." Debord defines them as Semi-historical religions. "The growth of knowledge about society, which includes the understanding of history as the heart of culture, derives from itself an irreversible knowledge, which is expressed by the destruction of God."

=== Critique of American sociology ===
In Chapter 8, "Negation and Consumption Within Culture", Debord includes a critical analysis of the works of three American sociologists. Debord discusses at length Daniel J. Boorstin's The Image (1961), arguing that Boorstin missed the concept of Spectacle. In thesis 192, Debord mentions some American sociologists who have described the general project of developed capitalism which "aims to recapture the fragmented worker as a personality well integrated in the group;" the examples mentioned by Debord are David Riesman, author of The Lonely Crowd (1950), and William H. Whyte, author of the 1956 bestseller The Organization Man. Among the 1950s sociologists who are usually compared to Riesman and Whyte, is C. Wright Mills, the author of White Collar: The American Middle Classes. Riesman's "Lonely Crowd" term is also used in thesis 28.

=== Authenticity, plagiarism, and Lautréamont ===
Because the notion of the spectacle involves real life being replaced by representations of life, Society of the Spectacle is also concerned with the notion of authenticity versus inauthenticity, a theme which is revisited in Chapter 8, "Negation and Consumption within Culture". In Debord's treatment, modern society forces culture to constantly re-appropriate or re-invent itself, copying and re-packaging old ideas. Thesis 207 makes this point, rhetorically:

"Ideas improve. The meaning of words participates in the improvement. Plagiarism is necessary. Progress implies it. It embraces an author's phrase, makes use of his expressions, erases a false idea, and replaces it with the right idea."

This passage concerning plagiarism is itself directly lifted from Poésies by French-Uruguayan author Isidore Lucien Ducasse, better known as the Comte de Lautréamont. In particular, the original French text for both Debord and Lautréamont's versions of the passage are identical: "Les idées s'améliorent. Le sens des mots y participe. Le plagiat est nécessaire. Le progrès l'implique. Il serre de près la phrase d'un auteur, se sert de ses expressions, efface une idée fausse, la remplace par l'idée juste."

== Translations and editions in English ==
See external links for links to read the following editions for free.

- Translation by Fredy Perlman and friends ("Radical America Series", Detroit: Black & Red, 1970; rev. ed. 1977; reprinted by AK Press, 2005).
- Translation by Donald Nicholson-Smith (Zone, 1994).
- Translation by Ken Knabb (Rebel Press, 2004; PM Press, 2024; Bureau of Public Secrets web edition, continually updated).
- Translation by Ron Adams (Unredacted Word, 2021; Unredacted Word web edition, 2nd ed. 2022)

=== 1983 edition ===
1983 edition of Society of the Spectacle

The book cover of the 1983 edition is derived from a photograph by the Life magazine photographer, J. R. Eyerman. On November 26, 1952, at the Paramount Theatre, the premiere screening of the film Bwana Devil by Arch Oboler took place as the first full-length, color 3-D (aka 'Natural Vision') motion picture. Eyerman took a series of photographs of the audience wearing 3-D glasses.

Life magazine used one of the photographs as the cover of a brochure about the 1946–1955 decade. The photograph employed in the Black and Red edition shows the audience in "a virtually trance-like state of absorption, their faces grim, their lips pursed;" however, in the one chosen by Life, "the spectators are laughing, their expressions of hilarity conveying the pleasure of an uproarious, active spectatorship." The Black and Red version also is flipped left to right, and cropped. Despite widespread association among English-speaking readers, Debord had nothing to do with this cover illustration, which was chosen by Black and Red.

== See also ==
- Culture industry
- History and Class Consciousness
- Hyperreality
- Vance Packard
- No Logo
