= International Movement for an Imaginist Bauhaus =

Artist collective and art movement; precursor to the Situationists

- Movimento internazionale per una Bauhaus immaginista
- Abbreviation: MIBI
- Successor: Situationist International
- Formation: 29 September 1955
- Founder: Asger Jorn; Giuseppe Pinot-Gallizio; Piero Simondo
- Dissolved: 28 July 1957
- Headquarters: Alba

The International Movement for an Imaginist Bauhaus was a small European avant-garde artistic tendency that arose out of the breakup of CoBrA, and was initiated by contact between former CoBrA members Asger Jorn and Enrico Baj and Sergio Dangelo of the Nuclear Art Movement.

When Asger Jorn recovered from tuberculosis in the autumn of 1952, he tried for a year to restart his career in Denmark. However, in autumn 1953 he moved to Villars-sur-Ollon in Switzerland. It was here he heard of the Hochschule fur Gestaltung in Ulm. However, when he wrote to Max Bill with a proposal for collaboration, it soon became apparent that their views were highly divergent. Jorn wrote in a letter to Enrico Baj: "[A] Swiss architect, Max Bill, has undertaken to restructure the Bauhaus where Klee and Kandinsky taught. He wishes to make an academy without painting, without research into the imagination, fantasy, signs, symbols – all he wants is technical instruction. In the name of experimental artists I intend to create an International Movement For An Imaginist Bauhaus."

== Timeline ==
- 1954: Jorn finds a copy of Potlatch, the information bulletin of the Letterist International at Baj's house. He then contacts Andre-Frank Connord, who puts him in contact with Guy Debord and Michèle Bernstein.
- 29 September 1955: IMIB is founded in Alba, Italy by Jorn, Giuseppe Pinot-Gallizio, and Piero Simondo.
- July 1956: One issue of Eristica, edited by Simondo, appears. It was published by Giuseppe Gallizio and contains: "Form and structure" by Asger Jorn; "For a general theory of the figurative arts" by Pietro Simondo and "Architectural functions, of democratic destinations" by Elena Verrone. The editorial board included Enrico Baj, Tullio Albisola and Ettore Sottsass.
- 28 July 1957: IMIB fused with the Letterist International and the London Psychogeographical Association to form the Situationist International. Baj was excluded from this process.

== See also ==
- Anti-art
