= Giuseppe Pinot-Gallizio =

Italian industrial painter, botanist, archaeologist, scholar and Situationist founder

Pinot Gallizio
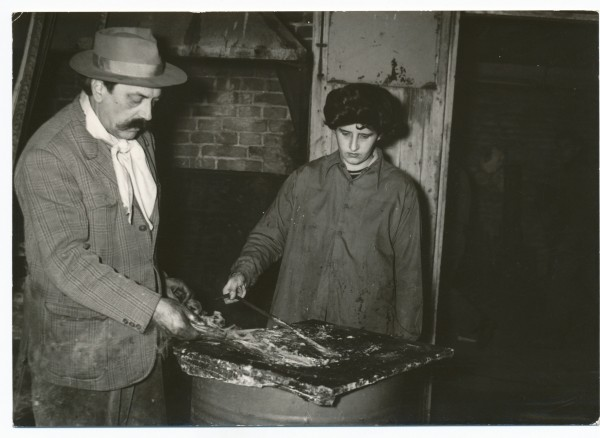
- Pinot Gallizio and Soshana Afroyim in 1960
- Born: 12 February 1902; Alba, Piedmont, Kingdom of Italy
- Died: 13 February 1964 (aged 62)
- Movement: MIBI; Situationism

Giuseppe Pinot-Gallizio (1902–1964) was an Italian painter, the formulator of industrial painting, and a founding member of the Situationist International. He was also a scholar of popular culture, archaeology, nomadism, and botany.

== Life ==
Pinot-Gallizio was born in Alba, Piedmont, where he became an independent Left councilman and a chemist. In 1955, he met Asger Jorn, with whom he co-founded the Experimental Laboratory of the Imaginist Bauhaus in Alba, which was part of the International Movement for an Imaginist Bauhaus, in opposition to the return to productivism by others in the Bauhaus school, in particular Max Bill. It was held in Pinot-Gallizio's studio, a monastery from the seventeenth century, and was attended by such artists as Enrico Baj who experimented with nuclear painting techniques, Walter Olmo, who experimented with musical interventions, Ettore Sottsass, Elena Verrone, and Piero Simondo.

Pinot-Gallizio drew from his background as a chemist in developing new painting techniques. In 1956 he, along with Jorn, organized the First World Congress of Free Artists, at which a representative from the Lettrist International spoke, foreshadowing the foundation of the Situationist International in 1957 by members of both groups, including Pinot-Gallizio. At this conference, the Italian artists withdrew from the Laboratory, and after the formation of the SI only Pinot-Gallizio and his son, Giors Melanotte, remained. He helped to make the SI known in the art world with an exhibition in Paris in 1959.

He left the SI in 1960 as it became focused on political, rather than artistic, action. He died in Alba in 1964, and the laboratory continued its work until his death.

== Works ==
Many of Pinot-Gallizio's works were industrial paintings. Rather than a small image to be interpreted, these huge canvases were intended to cover a large area. The first of these was the cavern of anti-matter, prepared in 1957 after the formation of the SI. It was composed of 145 metre canvases which were painted by hand or with the aid of spray guns and machines using resins invented by Pinot-Gallizio himself. It was displayed at the Galerie René Drouin in 1959, draped around the gallery and sold by the meter.
