= Asger Jorn =

Danish painter, sculptor, ceramic artist, and author (1914–1973)

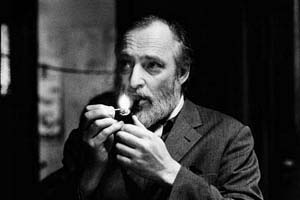
- Jorn photographed in 1963 by Erling Mandelmann
- Born: Asger Oluf Jørgensen; 3 March 1914; Vejrum, Jutland, Denmark
- Died: 1 May 1973 (aged 59); Århus, Denmark
- Burial place: Grötlingbo Church cemetery
- Known for: Painting
- Notable work: Stalingrad
- Movement: CoBrA; Situationist International

Asger Jorn (3 March 1914 – 1 May 1973) was a Danish painter, sculptor, ceramic artist, and author. He was a founding member of the avant-garde movement COBRA and the Situationist International.

The largest collection of Jorn's works—including his major work Stalingrad—can be seen in the Museum Jorn, Silkeborg, Denmark. Jorn willed his property and the works of art located inside to the Municipality of Albissola Marina (Savona), so the Italian museum called "Casa Museo Jorn" was created for displaying his works.

== Early life ==
He was born in Vejrum, in the northwest corner of Jutland, Denmark, and baptized Asger Oluf Jørgensen.

He was the second oldest of six children, an elder brother to Jørgen Nash. Both of his parents were teachers. His father, Lars Peter Jørgensen, a fundamentalist Christian, died from pneumonia (contracted after a car crash) when Asger was 12 years old. His mother, Maren, née Nielsen, was more liberal but nevertheless a deeply committed Christian. This early heavy Christian influence had a negative effect on Asger who began progressively to inwardly rebel against it, and more generally against other forms of authority.

In 1929, aged 15, he was diagnosed with tuberculosis, from which he recovered after spending three months on the west coast of Jutland. By the age of 16 he was influenced by N. F. S. Grundtvig, and although he had already started to paint, Asger enrolled in the Vinthers Seminarium, a teacher-training college in Silkeborg where he paid particular attention to a course in 19th century Scandinavian thought. Also at about this time Jorn became the subject of a number of oil paintings by the painter Martin Kaalund-Jørgensen, which encouraged Jorn to try his hand in this medium.

== Early career ==
When he graduated from college in 1935, the principal wrote a reference for him which said that he had attained "an extraordinary rich personal development and maturity" – especially because of his wide reading in areas outside the topics required for his studies. While at college he joined the small Silkeborg branch of the Communist Party of Denmark and came under the direct influence of the syndicalist Christian Christensen, with whom he became close friends and who, Jorn was later to write, was to become a second father to him.

In 1936 he traveled (on a BSA motorbike he had scraped together enough money to buy) to Paris to become a student of Kandinsky. However, when he discovered that Kandinsky was having economic difficulties, barely able to sell his own paintings, Jorn decided to join Fernand Léger's Académie Contemporaine; it was during this period that he turned away from figurative painting and to abstract art. In 1937 he joined Le Corbusier in working on the Pavillon des Temps Nouveaux at the 1937 Paris Exhibition. He returned again to Denmark in the summer of 1937. He again traveled to Paris in the summer of 1938, before returning to Denmark, traveling to Løkken, Silkeborg and Copenhagen. Asger Jorn was a good friend of the Danish art dealer Børge Birch, owner of Galerie Birch, who sold his art as early as the 1930s. Later on Jorn held many group exhibitions and solo exhibitions in different galleries.

From 1937 to 1942, he studied at the Royal Danish Academy of Fine Arts in Copenhagen.

== World War II ==
The occupation of Denmark by Nazi Germany was a time of deep crisis for Jorn, who had been deeply inculcated with pacifism. The occupation initially sank him into deep depression. He subsequently became active in the communist resistance movement. During the war he also co-founded with the architect Robert Dahlmann Olsen the underground art group, Helhesten or "hell-horse," and was a contributor to its journal with the same name, Helhesten. In 1939, he wrote the key theoretical essay, "Intimate Banalities," published in Helhesten, which claimed that the future of art was kitsch and praised amateur landscape paintings as "the best art today." He was also the first person to translate Franz Kafka into Danish.

== Post-war ==
After the war, he complained that opportunities for critical thinking within the context of the communist arena had been curtailed by what he characterised as a centralised bourgeois political control. Finding this unacceptable, he broke with the Communist Party of Denmark, although he did not hand in his membership until the mid-1960s and remained committed philosophically to a revision of the Marxist analysis of capitalism from the point of view of the artist.

He traveled again to France where in the autumn of 1948 he, together with Christian Dotremont and Constant, founded COBRA (a European avant-garde art movement), and edited monographs of the Bibliothèque Cobra. However, by 1949 Jorn had started a relationship with Matie van Domselaer, the daughter of the composer Jakob van Domselaer and music teacher Maike Middelkoop. She had been married to Constant since 1942 and they had not separated yet. Constant did not take to this kindly, which played a role in the later falling apart of the Cobra Movement. This caused tension in the COBRA group with the Dutch artists boycotting a conference held at Bregnerød later that year. Matie and Jorn were married in 1950 and they had a son Ole and daughter Bodil. The COBRA group dissolved in 1951

He returned, impoverished and seriously ill with tuberculosis, to Silkeborg in 1951 and resumed work in the ceramics field in 1953. The following year he traveled to Albissola Marina in Italy where he became involved with an offshoot of COBRA, the International Movement for an Imaginist Bauhaus.

=== Situationist International ===
In 1954 he met Guy Debord, who was to become a close friend. The two men collaborated on two artist's books, Fin de Copenhague (1957) and Mémoires (1959), along with prints, and forewords to each other's work.

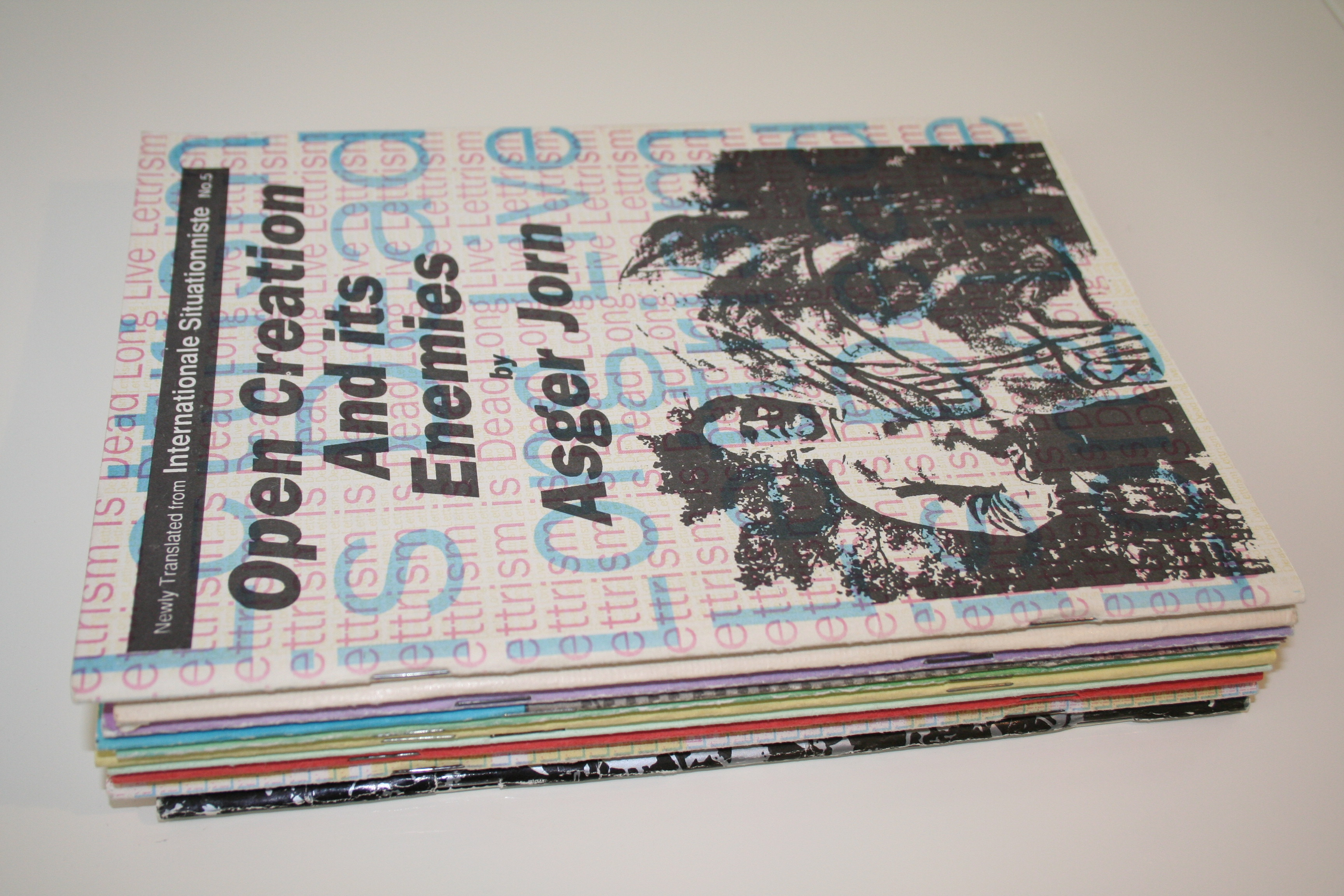
English translation of Creation Ouvert published by Unpopular Books

He participated in the conference that led to the merger of the International Movement for an Imaginist Bauhaus, the Lettriste Internationale, and London Psychogeographical Association to form the Situationist International in 1957. Here he applied his scientific and mathematical knowledge drawn from Henri Poincaré and Niels Bohr to develop his situlogical technique. Jorn never believed in a conception of the Situationist ideas as exclusively artistic and separated from political involvement. He was at the root and at the core of the Situationist International project, fully sharing the revolutionary intentions with Debord. The Situationist general principles were an attack on the capitalist exploitation and degradation of the life of people, and solution of alternative life experiences, construction of situations, unitary urbanism, psychogeography, with the union of play, freedom and critical thinking. Such general principles were applied by Jorn to painting.

In 1961 he amicably quit his activity in the SI, still fully supporting its contents and goals, and continuing to support it financially, but believing that the new strategy of the SI was ineffective.

He went on to found the Scandinavian Institute of Comparative Vandalism in Silkeborg and contributed material to the Situationist Times. Later, he donated a museum for modern art to the Danish town of Silkeborg, near where he grew up. He was to remain close to Debord, however, and continued to fund Situationist publications.

His philosophical system Triolectics was given a practical manifestation through the development of three sided football.

=== Later years ===
His first American solo exhibition was at the Lefebre Gallery in 1962. After 1966, Jorn continued to produce oil paintings while traveling throughout Europe collecting images with photographer Gerard Franceschi for his vast archive of "10,000 Years of Nordic Folk Art". He traveled extensively, to Cuba, England, and the far east. Jorn traveled to the United States for the only time in 1970, for a gallery opening at Lefebre Gallery. He had earlier asserted that he refused to travel to a country that made visitors sign a statement maintaining that they were not communists.

In 1964, he was awarded a Guggenheim Award including a generous cash prize, by an international jury assembled by Lawrence Alloway. The following day Jorn sent this telegram to the president of the Guggenheim, Harry F. Guggenheim:

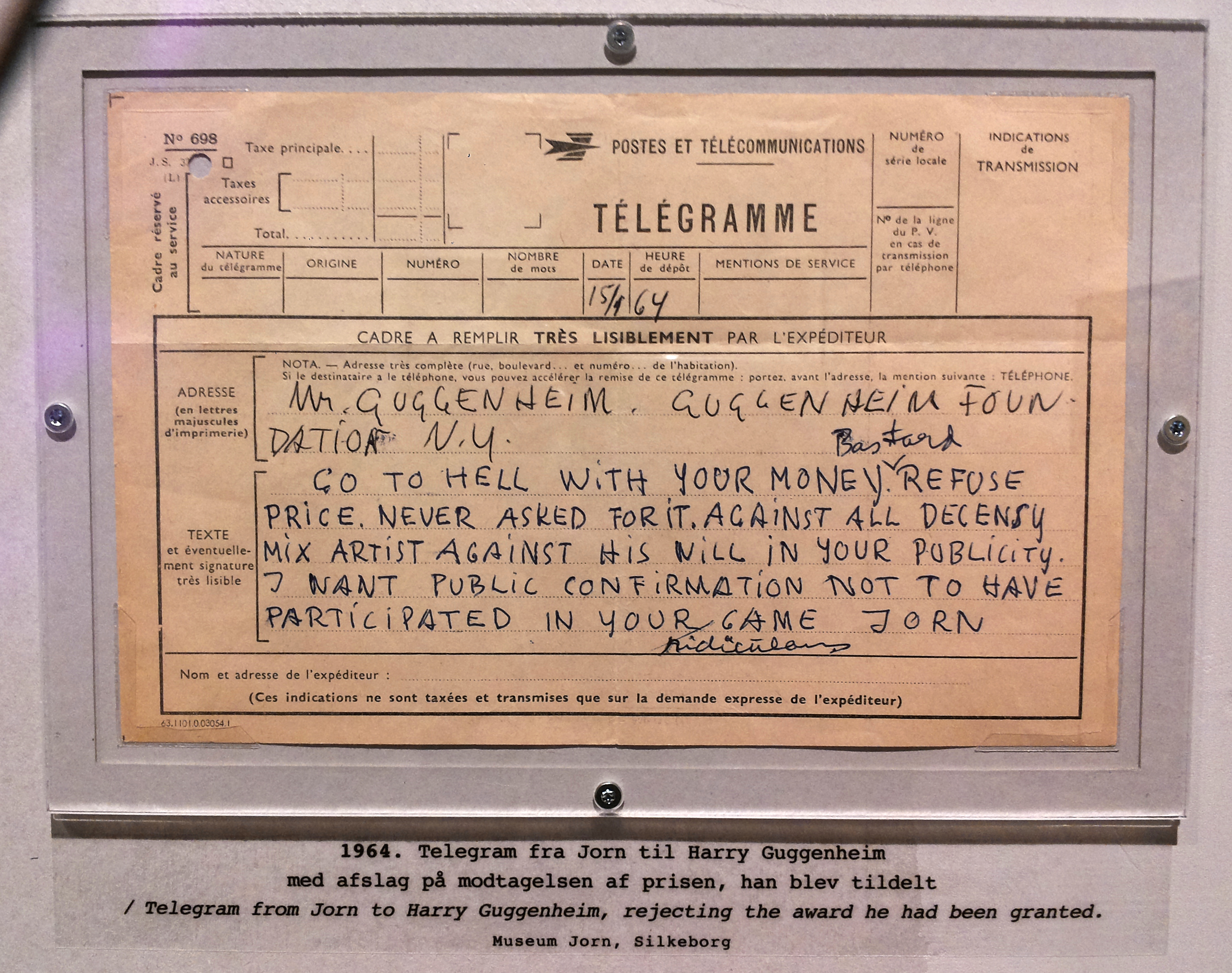
Asger Jorn's telegram to Guggenheim.

GO TO HELL WITH YOUR MONEY BASTARD—STOP—REFUSE PRICE [sic] —STOP—NEVER ASKED FOR IT—STOP—AGAINST ALL DECENSY [sic] MIX ARTIST AGAINST HIS WILL IN YOUR PUBLICITY—STOP—I WANT PUBLIC CONFIRMATION NOT TO HAVE PARTICIPATED IN YOUR RIDICULOUS GAME JORN

During the course of his artistic career he produced over 2,500 paintings, prints, drawings, ceramics, sculptures, artist's books, collages, décollages, and collaborative tapestries.Jorn authored more than twenty books on aesthetics, politics, and cultural theory in addition to his work as a painter and sculptor.

He died in Aarhus, Denmark on 1 May 1973. He is buried in the cemetery at Grötlingbo Church, on the island of Gotland in Sweden.

== Writing ==
=== Luck and Chance: Dagger and Guitar (1952) ===
The first edition of Luck and Chance was Jorn's first published book, issued privately to subscribers in 1952. It was written at the Silkeborg Sanatorium during his convalescence from a serious attack of tuberculosis aggravated by malnutrition and scurvy. Later in the process, it also became intended as a doctoral dissertation which was refused by a professor of philosophy at Copenhagen University. It is, amongst other things, a critique of Kierkegaard's triad of aesthetic, ethical and religious stages, and of his definition of truth. Another powerful influence appears to be present in ghostly form : Friedrich Nietzsche. It is one of the most fundamental texts to understand Jorn's undertaking of "a reconstruction of philosophy from the point of view of an artist".

=== Internationale Situationniste (1957–1961) ===
- Originality and Magnitude (on Isou's System) (1960), article in Internationale Situationiste No. 4.
- Open Creation and its Enemies (1960), article in Internationale Situationiste No. 5.
- Pataphysics, A Religion in the Making (1961), article in Internationale Situationiste No. 6.

=== Value and Economy ===
Critique of Political Economy and the Exploitation of the Unique (1961)

This book consists of two parts. The first is a concise critique of the apparent contradictions in Marx's Das Kapital which Jorn uses to prepare the ground for a discussion of how the work of "the creative elite" can have "value" in any future society aligned on communist principles. This was originally published in French in 1959 by the Internationale Situationniste and is the most straightforward and least discursive of all of Jorn's texts, probably because Guy Debord had a hand in the editing. The second part is a long polemic against contemporaneous Russian revisionism and the failed attempt by Denmark and Britain to join the Common Market, before coming to Jorn's main proposal, an economically independent international "creative elite" adopting typical Scandinavian institutions to realize "artistic value" for the greater universal good. He also attempts to reconcile the unique and individual position of the "creative elite" with his socialist principles. The second part alternates between objective and subjective modes.

=== The Natural Order (1962) ===
If this is a critique of Niels Bohr's theory of complementarity, then it is also to just the same high degree a critique of that dialectical materialism, that I in my earliest youth took to my heart and perceived to be the only acceptable principle for thought. (Asger Jorn)

=== Signes gravés sur les églises de l'Eure et du Calvados (1964) ===
Jorn had noticed some graffiti scratched into the porch at the church in Damville during a visit in 1946. Having noticed similar scratchings in Scandinavia at the cathedrals in Ribe, Lund, and Trondheim, Jorn decided to study the phenomenon. He was able to make a trip to Normandy in 1961 with Franceschi. They were able to record a number of such markings in Eure and Calvados, but not elsewhere. The results of the study were published as a book.

== See also ==
- Art of Denmark
- List of Danish painters
- Members of the Situationist International
- Museum Jorn, Silkeborg
- Tachisme
- Three-sided football
