= Guy Debord =

French philosopher and Marxist theorist (1931–1994)

- Born: Guy-Ernest Debord; 28 December 1931; Paris, France
- Died: 30 November 1994 (aged 62); Bellevue-la-Montagne, Haute-Loire, France
- Spouses: Michèle Bernstein (m. 1954; div. 1972) Alice Becker-Ho (m. 1972)

Education
- Education: University of Paris (attended)
- Academic advisor: Henri Lefèbvre

Philosophical work
- Era: 20th-century philosophy
- Region: Western philosophy
- School: Continental philosophy Letterist International; Situationist; Western Marxism
- Main interests: Class struggle Commodity fetishism Reification; Social alienation Social theory
- Notable ideas: Dérive; Détournement; Psychogeography; Recuperation; Spectacle

Guy-Ernest Debord (/dəˈbɔːr/ də-BOR; French: [gi dəbɔʁ]; 28 December 1931 – 30 November 1994) was a French Marxist theorist, philosopher, filmmaker, critic of work, member of the Letterist International, founder of a Letterist faction, and founding member of the Situationist International. He was also briefly a member of Socialisme ou Barbarie. Debord is best known for his 1967 work, The Society of the Spectacle, alongside his direction to the Letterist and Situationist Magazines.

== Biography ==
=== Early life ===
Guy Debord was born in Paris in 1931. Debord's father, Martial, was a pharmacist who died when Debord was young. Debord's mother, Paulette Rossi, sent Debord to live with his grandmother in her family villa in Italy. During World War II, the Rossis left the villa and began to travel from town to town. As a result, Debord attended high school in Cannes, where he began his interest in film and vandalism.

As a young man, Debord actively opposed the French war in Algeria and joined in demonstrations in Paris against it. Debord studied law at the University of Paris, but left early and did not complete his university education, opting to involve himself in the avant-garde arts.

=== Involvement with the Lettrists ===
Debord joined the Lettrists when he was 18. The Lettrists were led dictatorially by Isidore Isou until a widely agreed upon schism ended Isou's authority. This schism gave rise to several factions. One of them, the Letterist International, was decidedly led by Debord upon Gil Wolman's unequivocal recommendation. In the 1960s, Debord led the Situationist International group, which influenced the Paris Uprising of 1968, during which he took part in the occupation of the Sorbonne. Some consider his book The Society of the Spectacle (1967) to be a catalyst for the uprising.

=== Founding of the Situationist International ===
In 1957, the Letterist International, the International Movement for an Imaginist Bauhaus, and the London Psychogeographical Association gathered in Cosio d'Arroscia (Imperia), Italy, to found the Situationist International, with Debord having been the leading representative of the Letterist delegation. Initially made up of a number of well-known artists such as Asger Jorn and Pinot Gallizio, the early days of the SI were heavily focused on the formulation of a critique of art, which would serve as a foundation for the group's future entrance into further political critiques. The SI was known for a number of its interventions in the art world, which included one raid against an international art conference in Belgium during 1958, resulting in a large pamphlet drop and significant media coverage, all of which culminated in the arrest of various situationists and sympathizers associated with the scandal. In addition to this action, the SI endeavored to formulate industrial painting, or, painting prepared en masse with the intent of defaming the original value largely associated with the art of the period. In the course of these actions, Debord was heavily involved in the planning and logistical work associated with preparing these interventions, as well as the work for Internationale Situationniste associated with theoretical defense of the Situationist International's actions.

=== Political phase of the Situationist International ===
With Debord's 1967 The Society of the Spectacle and excerpts from the group's journal, Internationale Situationniste, the Situationists began to formulate their theory of the spectacle, which explained the nature of late capitalism's historical decay. In Debord's terms, situationists defined the spectacle as an assemblage of social relations transmitted via the imagery of class power, and as a period of capitalist development wherein "all that was once lived has moved into representation". With this theory, Debord and the SI would go on to play an influential role in the revolts of May 1968 in France, with many of the protesters drawing their slogans from Situationist tracts penned or influenced by Debord.

=== After the Situationist International ===
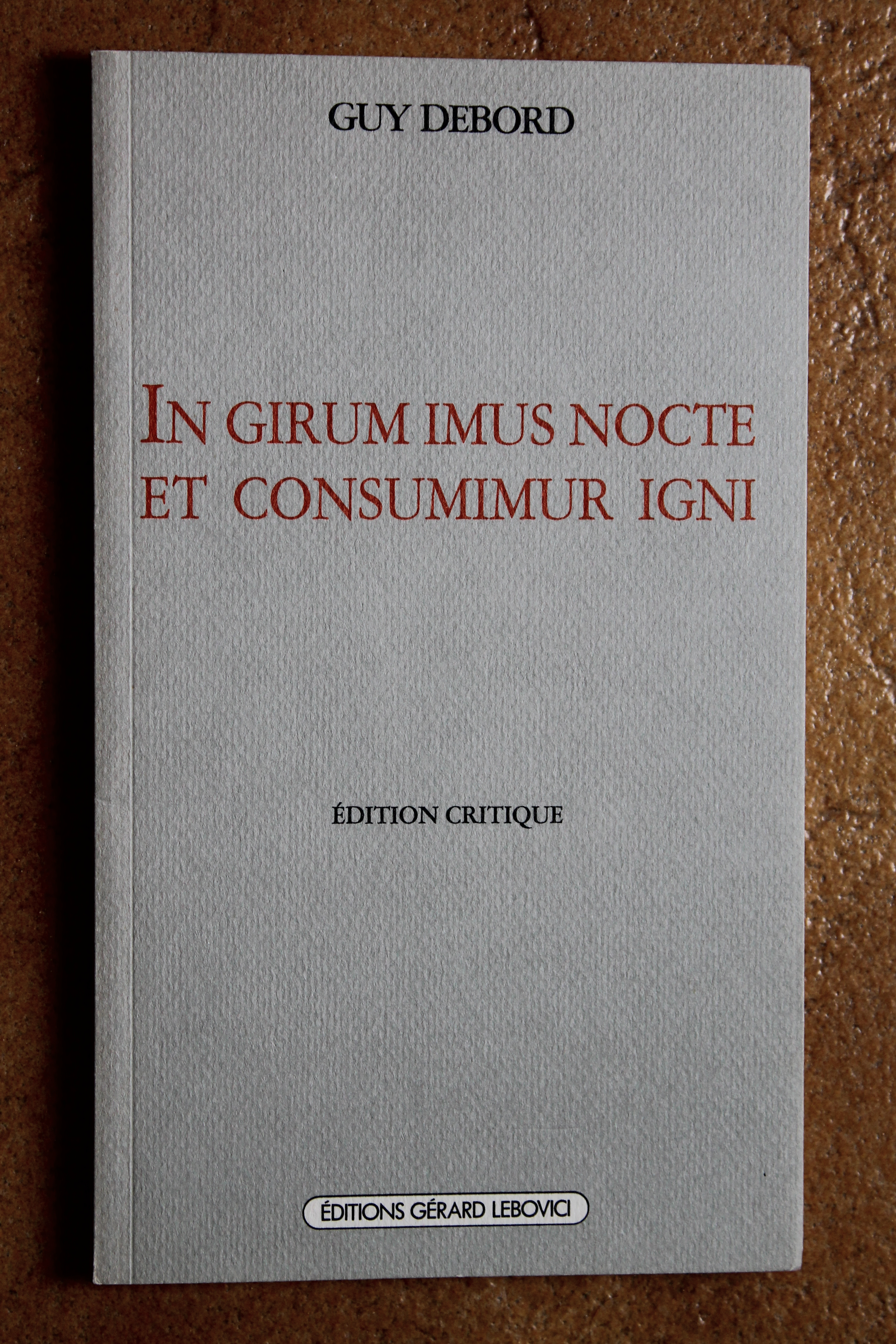
Published by Éditions Gérard Lebovici (1990)

In 1972, Debord disbanded the Situationist International after its original members, including Asger Jorn and Raoul Vaneigem, quit or were expelled (Vaneigem wrote a biting criticism of Debord and the International). Debord then focused on filmmaking with financial backing from the movie mogul and publisher Gérard Lebovici (éditions Champ Libre), until Lebovici's mysterious death. Debord was suspected of Lebovici's murder. He had agreed to have his films released posthumously at the request of the American researcher Thomas Y. Levin.

After dissolving the Situationist International, Debord spent his time reading, and occasionally writing, in relative isolation in a cottage at Champot with Alice Becker-Ho, his second wife. He continued to correspond on political and other issues, notably with Lebovici and the Italian situationist Gianfranco Sanguinetti. He focused on reading material relating to war strategies, e.g. Clausewitz and Sun Tzu, and he designed a war game with Alice Becker-Ho.

=== Death ===
Just before his death, Debord filmed (although did not release) the documentary Son art et son temps (His Art and His Times), an autobiography of sorts that focused primarily on social issues in Paris in the 1990s. It has been suggested that his dark depiction of this period was a suicide note of sorts. Both Debord's depression and alcohol consumption had become problematic, resulting in a form of polyneuritis. Perhaps to end the suffering caused by these conditions, Debord died by suicide on 30 November 1994, shooting himself through the heart. This was not the first time he attempted to end his life.

Debord's suicide is as controversial as it is unclear. Some assert that it was a revolutionary act related to his career. Due to his involvement with the radical Situationist International (SI), as well as his sadness at 'the society as a spectacle' being considered a cliché in later life, many think that Debord felt hopeless about the very society he was trying to shed light on. Debord was said to be "victim of the Spectacle he fought". Among the many commentaries on Debord's demise, Edward A. Shanken noted: "Guy Debord did not kill himself. He was murdered by the thoughtlessness and selfishness of so-called scholars (primarily trendy lit-criters) who colonized his brilliant ideas and transformed his radical politics into an academic status symbol not worth the pulp it's printed on..."

== Works ==
=== Written works ===
Guy Debord's best known works are The Society of the Spectacle and Comments on the Society of the Spectacle. In addition to these works he wrote a number of autobiographical books including Mémoires, Panégyrique, Cette Mauvaise Réputation..., and Considérations sur l'assassinat de Gérard Lebovici. He was also the author of numerous short pieces, sometimes anonymous, for the journals Potlatch, Les Lèvres Nues, Les Chats Sont Verts, and Internationale Situationniste. For Debord, the Spectacle is viewed as false representations in our real lives. The spectacle is a materialized worldview. The spectacle 'subjects human beings to itself'.

Debord was deeply distressed by the hegemony of governments and media over everyday life through mass production and consumption. He criticized both the capitalism of the West and the dictatorial communism of the Eastern Bloc for the lack of autonomy allowed to individuals by both types of governmental structure. Debord postulated that Alienation had gained a new relevance through the invasive forces of "the spectacle" – "a social relation between people that is mediated by images" consisting of mass media, advertisement, and popular culture. The spectacle is a self-fulfilling control mechanism for society. Debord's analysis developed the notions of "reification" and "commodity fetishism" pioneered by Karl Marx and Georg Lukács. Semiotics was also a major influence, particularly the work of his contemporary Roland Barthes, who was the first to envisage bourgeois society as a spectacle and to study in detail the political function of fashion within that spectacle. Debord's analysis of "the spectaclist society" probed the historical, economic, and psychological roots of the media and popular culture. Debord's first book, Mémoires, was bound with a sandpaper cover so that it would damage other books placed next to it.

=== Films ===
Debord began an interest in film early in his life when he lived in Cannes in the late 1940s. Debord recounted that, during his youth, he was allowed to do very little other than attend films. He said that he frequently would leave in the middle of a screening because films often bored him. Debord joined the Lettrists just as Isidore Isou was producing films and the Lettrists attempted to sabotage Charlie Chaplin's trip to Paris through negative criticism.

Overall, Debord challenged the conventions of filmmaking, prompting his audience to interact with the medium instead of being passive receivers of information. Debord directed his first film, Hurlements en faveur de Sade, in 1952 with the voices of Michèle Bernstein and Gil Wolman. The film has no images; instead, it shows bright white when there is speaking and black when there is not. Long silences separate speaking parts. The film ends with 24 minutes of black silence. People were reported to have become angry and left screenings of this film. The script is composed of quotes appropriated from various sources and made into a montage with a sort of non-linear narrative.

==== Filmography ====
- Hurlements en faveur de Sade (Howls for Sade),1952
- Sur le passage de quelques personnes à travers une assez courte unité de temps (On the Passage of a Few Persons Through a Rather Brief Unity of Time), 1959 (short film, Dansk-Fransk Experimentalfilmskompagni)
- Critique de la séparation (Critique of Separation), 1961 (short film, Dansk-Fransk Experimentalfilmskompagni)
- La Société du spectacle (Society of the Spectacle), 1973 (Simar Films)
- Réfutation de tous les judgements, tant élogieux qu'hostiles, qui ont été jusqu'ici portés sur le film " La Société du spectacle " (Refutation of All the Judgements, Pro or Con, Thus Far Rendered on the Film "The Society of the Spectacle"), 1975 (short film, Simar Films)
- In girum imus nocte et consumimur igni (a Latin palindrome meaning "We Go Round and Round in the Night, and Are Consumed by Fire") (Simar Films), 1978 – This film was meant to be Debord's last and is largely autobiographical. The script was reprinted in 2007 in No: A Journal of the Arts.
- Guy Debord, son art, son temps (Guy Debord – His Art and His Time), 1994 (a "sabotage television film" by Guy Debord and Brigitte Cornand, Canal Plus)

== Legacy ==
On 29 January 2009, fifteen years after his death, Christine Albanel, Minister of Culture, classified the archive of his works as a "national treasure" in response to a sale request by Yale University. The Ministry declared that "he has been one of the most important contemporary thinkers, with a capital place in history of ideas from the second half of the twentieth century."

In a critical appraisal written after Debord's death, Régis Debray characterized his work as derivative of Ludwig Feuerbach (asking, for example, "Had nothing, then, taken place in history and philosophy between 1841 and 1967?") and essentialist, "rest[ing] on the idea of a generic nature, of man's pre-existent essence." For Debray, Debord's emancipatory vision is abstract and ahistorical: "It disclaims political mediation as a structuring instantiation of collective existence, along with technical mediation as a structuring instantiation of the hominization process. Nor does our author ever speak the language of technology or politics: such silence is typical of the moralist in all ages and climes. He fulminates from afar without taking a look up close."

== Bibliography ==
- Debord, Guy (1957). Report on the Construction of Situations.
- Mémoires, 1959 (co-authored by Asger Jorn), reprinted by Allia (2004), ISBN 2-84485-143-6.
- La société du spectacle, 1967, numerous editions; in English: The Society of the Spectacle, Zone Books, 1995, ISBN 0-942299-79-5. Society of the Spectacle, Rebel Press, 2004, ISBN 0-946061-12-2. The Society of the Spectacle: Annotated Edition, Bureau of Public Secrets, 2014, ISBN 978-0-939682-06-5.
- La Véritable Scission dans L'Internationale, Champ Libre, 1972 (co-authored by Gianfranco Sanguinetti); in English: The Real Split in the International, Pluto Press, 2003, ISBN 0-7453-2128-3.
- Œuvres cinématographiques complètes, Champ Libre, 1978, new edition in 1994; in English: Complete Cinematic Works: Scripts, Stills, and Documents, AK Press, 2003, ISBN 1-902593-73-1.
- Considérations sur l'assassinat de Gérard Lebovici, éditions Gérard Lebovici, 1985; in English: Considerations on the Assassination of Gérard Lebovici, TamTam, 2001, ISBN 2-85184-156-4.
- Le Jeu de la Guerre, 1987; in English A Game of War, Atlas Press 2008, ISBN 978-1-900565-38-7
- Commentaires sur la société du spectacle, éditions Gérard Lebovici, 1988; in English: Comments on the Society of the Spectacle, Verso, 1990, ISBN 0-86091-302-3.
- Panégyrique volume 1, 1989; in English: Panegyric, Verso 2004, reprinted 2009, ISBN 1-85984-665-3; in Portuguese: "Panegírico" [2002], ISBN 85-87193-77-5.
- All of Guy Debord's books and films as well as unpublished texts were gathered in a volume of Œuvres, Paris: Éditions Gallimard, collection Quarto, 2006.
- "The Proletariat as Subject and as Representation"
