= Ioannis Papadiamantopoulos =

Ioannis Papadiamantopoulos (Greek: Ιωάννης Παπαδιαμαντόπουλος) may refer to:

- Ioannis Papadiamantopoulos (1766–1826), Greek revolutionary leader
- Ioannis Papadiamantopoulos (major general), Greek officer
- Jean Moréas (born Ioannis A. Papadiamantopoulos), poet
