= Papadiamantopoulos =

Papadiamantopoulos (Greek: Παπαδιαμαντόπουλος) is a surname of Greek origin meaning "Son of Papadiamantis". The feminine form is Papadiamantopoulou (Greek: Παπαδιαμαντόπουλου) meaning "Son of Papadiamantis or Son of Papadiamantopoulos" People having this surname include:

- Ioannis Papadiamantopoulos (elder) (1766–1826), Greek revolutionary leader
- Jean Moréas (born Ioannis A. Papadiamantopoulos), poet
