= Ansgar Elde =

Swedish artist and Situationist (1933–2000)

Ansgar Elde (27 November 1933 – 4 December 2000) was a Swedish artist famous for his work in ceramics.

Elde was a member of the Situationist International (SI). On 15 March 1962, Elde was excluded from the SI along with Jørgen Nash. Both had been on the central committee and were accused of conspiring with certain art collectors. In fact, they had defended Ervin Eisch, Lothar Fischer, Dieter Kunzelmann, Renee Nele, Heimrad Prem, Gretel Stadler, Helmut Sturm and Hand-Peter Zimmer who had been excluded on 10 February 1962.

He went on, with Jørgen Nash and others, to work on the Second Situationist International.

Elde collaborated with Asger Jorn on the large ceramic work made in Albisola, Italy, transported to Aarhus, Denmark by train.

In 1964 in Chicago he received the Copley Foundation Award.

In the early nineties Heike Arndt met Ansgar and accepted his invitation to Savona, Italy, where she developed her work.

The highest known price for an item made by Elde at auction is 4,446 USD for "Senza titolo" that was sold by the Il Ponte Auction House, Via Pontaccio in 2018.
