= Golden Fleet =

Swedish situationist group

- Gyllene Flottan
- Formation: Late 1960s
- Dissolved: Early 1970s
- Type: Left-wing revolutionary group Situationist collective
- Legal status: Defunct
- Headquarters: Stockholm
- Location: Sweden

The Golden Fleet (Swedish: Gyllene Flottan) was a minor left-wing group in Sweden, existing during the end of the 1960s and the beginning of the 1970s. It was ideologically aligned with the Situationist International, an avant-garde revolutionary movement. The Situationists, whose intellectual foundations were derived primarily from libertarian Marxism and the avant-garde art movements of the early 20th century (particularly Dada and Surrealism), initially put its emphasis on concepts like unitary urbanism and psychogeography. Gradually the focus moved more towards revolutionary and political theory. Much like the main organ of that particular ideological current, the Situationist International, the Golden Fleet had its heyday around the protests of 1968, gradually disappearing by the first years of the 1970s.

Extremely little is known about the Golden Fleet, yet still it became notorious, this to such an extent that it has been labelled "legendary". Nothing is known about its establishment, composition, and disestablishment. The name was most likely taken from an art exhibit in Denmark by the Situationist Jeppesen Victor Martin, which consisted of geopolitical paintings featuring coastlines, strategic arrows and toy battleships sprayed over with metallic paint. The group was centered in the capital Stockholm, although some members appear to have been from Gothenburg. It is primarily notable through the fact that its members were those that introduced situationist writings to Sweden by its brief but hectic work with publishing political texts. Among them were Instruktion i vapendragning in 1970 (a translation of "Instructions for an Insurrection", originally published 1961), as well as longer translations of texts by Guy Debord and Raoul Vaneigem among others.

The group also produced a number of works on its own, prominent among them the poster "Hang the Stalinists High" (Swedish: Häng stalinisterna högt, on the subject of the contemporary left-wing) and the brochure "King Gustaf's Sardines" (Swedish: Kung Gustafs sardiner) which discussed the "meaningful meaninglessness of the Swedish students". Another Situationist group existed in Sweden, the Second Situationist International of Jørgen Nash, but there appears to have been no connection between the Golden Fleet and the Nashists.
