= Situationist Antinational =

American art and political theory magazine

The Situationist Antinational was an American magazine formed by Jens Jørgen Thorsen and Jeppesen Victor Martin in 1974, two years after the disbanding of the Situationist International. Only one issue of the magazine was published. It included a contribution by the American Situationist Jon Horelick, entitled "Beyond The Crisis Of Abstraction And The Abstract Break With That Crisis: The SI" and a Draft Manifesto of Antinational Situationist, signed by Jørgen Nash, Heimrad Prem, and Helmut Sturm, amongst others. All of the contributors were associated with the Second Situationist International.
