= Nashism (disambiguation) =

Nashism (Russian: нашизм) and Nashists are post-Soviet Russian political neologisms derived from the word "наши" ("ours").

Nashism or Nashist may also refer to:

- Nashists, members of the Second Situationist International movement, named after Jørgen Nash
- Nashi (1990s nationalist group), a 1991 movement by Alexander Nevzorov
- Nashi (youth movement), Russia, 2005
