= Le Symboliste =

Short-lived weekly French newspaper

Le Symboliste was a short-lived weekly French newspaper created by Jean Moréas (editor-in-chief), Gustave Kahn (managing editor), and Paul Adam (editorial secretary). Its creation closely followed the publication of Jean Moréas's "Symbolist Manifesto" in the literary supplement of Figaro (18 September 1886), which claimed the epithet "symbolist" and rejected "decadent". Only four issues were ever published, the first on 7 October and the last on 30 October 1886. There were four pages per issue, and it cost ten centimes. Despite its brief run, it was important in the Symbolist movement.
