= Symbolist Manifesto =

1886 art manifesto by Jean Moréas

The Symbolist Manifesto (French: Le Symbolisme) was published on 18 September 1886 in the French newspaper Le Figaro by the Greek-born poet and essayist Jean Moréas. It describes a new literary movement, an evolution from and rebellion against both romanticism and naturalism, and it asserts the name of Symbolism as not only appropriate for that movement, but also uniquely reflective of how creative minds approach the creation of art.

The manifesto was also intended to serve more practical, immediate needs. Moréas, together with Gustave Kahn and others, felt a need to distinguish themselves from a group of writers associated with Anatole Baju and Le Décadent. For Moréas and Kahn's group, the self-identified decadent writers represented both an earlier stage of development on the path towards symbolism, and also a frivolous exploitation of the language and techniques of the movement.

Definition became especially important with the publication of Les Deliquescence d'Adore Floupette, a work of intentional parody whose mimicry was technically perfect, but whose content was a mockery of what was important to Moréas, Kahn, and their group. However, because of the skill with which it was executed, the reading public thought that Les Deliquescence was representative of this new literature. Clarification was essential.

The manifesto unfolds as an introduction establishing the purpose of the document and then three stages: an opening argument, a dramatic intermezzo, and a closing argument.

== Opening argument ==
The first stage of making the case for Symbolism is an aggressive and frank definition of the movement, its beliefs and priorities. As a reaction against the authority of rational naturalism, the manifesto describes symbolists as enemies "of education, declamation, wrong feelings, [and] objective description." As a reaction against the newly self-styled decadents, the manifesto goes on to stipulate the primacy of "the Idea". The purpose of creativity is to find an appropriate way to subjectively express the Idea through extravagant analogy, using natural and concrete things to obliquely reference "primordial Ideas". Against charges of obscurity resulting from this approach, the manifesto simply points to many allegorical or obscurely symbolic characters from widely accepted literature.

The conclusion of the opening argument is an explanation of the style itself. Moréas lays forth the sort of paradox that is typical for symbolist art when he talks about the rhythm of their writing: ancient but lively, chaotic but ordered, fluid but boldly assertive. He then gives an appropriately colorful and obscure description of their literary technique:

... an archetypal and complex style; of unpolluted terms, periods which brace themselves alternating with periods of undulating lapses, significant pleonasms, mysterious ellipses, outstanding anacoluthia, any audacious and multiform surplus; finally the good language – instituted and updated –, good and luxuriant and energetic french language ...

== Dramatic intermezzo ==
The second portion of the manifesto is a brief drama in two scenes, featuring poet Théodore de Banville whose 1871 work Petit Traité de Poésie Française ("A Small Treatise on French Poetry") helped to liberate French poets from traditions and rules that prevented the free exercise of their creativity. Different qualities of the French language lent themselves to different kinds of poetic rhythm and structures. He also increased the emphasis on poetry as an exercise for the poet in developing clever rhyming games.

There are three characters in the drama: A DETRACTOR OF THE SYMBOLIC SCHOOL, MR THEODORE DE BANVILLE, and ERATO.

In the first scene, DETRACTOR melodramatically raises a series of charges against symbolism and Banville stands in for the defense of the movement. The charges of interest are grandiloquence, a vainglorious spirit, violation of the rules of poetry, and the continuing importance of romantic literature. Banville responds aptly to each charge and does so in a way that allows him to drive home some of the important emphases of the symbolist movement:

- Truth in excess and extravagance.
- Truth in apparent chaos and insanity.
- Truth in subjective experience.
- The danger of platitudes and natural banality.
- The constant need to be ever more audacious.
- The risk of what was once rebellious to become conformist.

In the second scene, ERATO praises Banville for Petit Traité de Poésie Française, but speaks on behalf of the young poets of this new movement, who feel abandoned by him. Banville makes a brief lament and leaves, described in the text with a sly reference to his work, The Exiles. That collection of poetry was Banville's most personal attempt to pour all of himself in the name of all those who have been abandoned.

== Closing argument ==
The manifesto concludes by first explaining the power of art and literature to bring together streams of thought and transform them into new and grand things, implying both its grandeur and its wonder. Moréas credits writers of other traditions with their accomplishments in this regard, but then argues that symbolists are uniquely positioned to deal with the essence of life: the human being within a reality that has been distorted by his own hallucinations. Symbolists are free to work with things both mechanical and mythical, things seen ahead and recalled from behind.

The final words of the Symbolist Manifesto are that "art would not know how to search into the objective, what an extremely succinct and simple starting point." For thus art must do its searching within the subjective.

== Roots ==
According to the manifesto, there are traces of early symbolism in the work of Alfred de Vigny, William Shakespeare, and unnamed others. Specific credit was also given to Victor Hugo for the manner in which his French romantic literature established the precedent of change. The manifesto situates symbolist novel-writing in the realm established by such authors as Stendhal, Balzac, Flaubert, and Edmond de Goncourt, and Émile Zola. These authors exhibited craftsmanship that Moréas respected, and some of them shared a disillusion with human progress, but they explored all that in a way that assumed the objectivity of human reality and primacy of the natural world.

The manifesto identifies a few poets as most immediately responsible for developing this current symbolism: Charles Baudelaire, Stéphane Mallarmé, Paul Verlaine, and Theodore de Banville. Symbolism was seen, however as a work in-progress, constantly being refined, including by the efforts of those writers. Moréas left the door open, as well, for newcomers to shape the movement even further.

== Influence and legacy ==
Moréas did not choose to publish the Symbolist Manifesto in a small publication such as the short-lived La Vogue or Le Symboliste, even though he helped run the latter. Instead, he chose to first publish in Le Temps, one of the major newspapers in Paris. After generating some immediate heat, he was then given the opportunity to publish the piece in Le Figaro. This scope of publication, including Le Figaro's status as highest-circulating paper, ensured the attention of readers, writers, and the general public alike. The impact of the manifesto was tremendous. The writers who were part of this movement were recognized as symbolists and the only traces of the old "decadence" were primarily those affiliated with Anatole Baju, precisely those that Moréas wished to be regarded as distinct from his own group. At the same time, it made the symbolist label the new go-to for anti-establishment writers, and, apart from Baju's group, many writers who had been called decadent previously were now called symbolist, not because of any change in their perspective or method, but because of a change in the jargon.

As a bold, clear statement of symbolism, Le Symbolisme is often taken as the model document for all symbolism, but it is the statement of Jean Moréas on behalf of a movement with no formal membership. Even close allies wrote their own responses to the manifesto, differing on points of evidence. Gustave Kahn, for example, preferred to situate symbolism in the realm of impressionism rather than as an evolution of naturalism.
