= Noël Arnaud =

French writer (1919–2003)

Noël Arnaud (pseudonym of Raymond Valentin Muller) (15 December 1919, Paris - 1 April, 2003, Montauban) was a French writer and publisher of avant-garde artistic material, of which he became a significant collector. He was editor of the journal The Situationist Times with Jacqueline de Jong.
