= Van Abbemuseum =

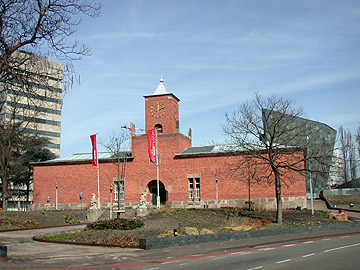
- Entrance in the old wing of the museum

- Location in North Brabant, Netherlands
- Location: Bilderdijklaan 10; Eindhoven, Netherlands
- Coordinates: 51°26′5″N 5°28′56″E
- Type: Art museum
- Visitors: 98,100 (2012)
- Founder: Henri van Abbe
- Website: www.vanabbemuseum.nl

The Van Abbemuseum (Dutch pronunciation: [vɑn ˈɑbəmyˌzeːjʏm]) in Eindhoven is one of the first public museums for contemporary art to be established in Europe.

The museum’s collection contains over 3,400 artworks. This includes key works and archives by Joseph Beuys, Marc Chagall, René Daniëls, Marlene Dumas, Sheela Gowda, Patricia Kaersenhout, Gülsün Karamustafa, Iris Kensmil, Oskar Kokoschka, John Körmeling, El Lissitzky (of whom it owns one of the largest collections of paintings in the world), Paul McCarthy, Pablo Picasso, Martha Rosler, and Lidwien van de Ven. The museum has an area of 9,825 m^{2} and holds one of the largest collections of paintings in the world by El Lissitzky.

== History ==
Established on the east bank of the Dommel River in 1936, the museum is named after its founder, the cigar businessman Henri van Abbe, who loved modern art and wanted his collection to be enjoyed in Eindhoven. Van Abbe therefore sold his collection to the Eindhoven city council in 1934. In return for buying some of his collection, the Van Abbe factory paid for and donated the museum building, which opened in 1936. The city had architect Alexander Kropholler design a building that is a symmetrical suite of galleries in the traditionalist style. The museum name was given in publications as "Stedelijk Van Abbemuseum" until approximately 1990 and as "Van Abbemuseum" after that time.

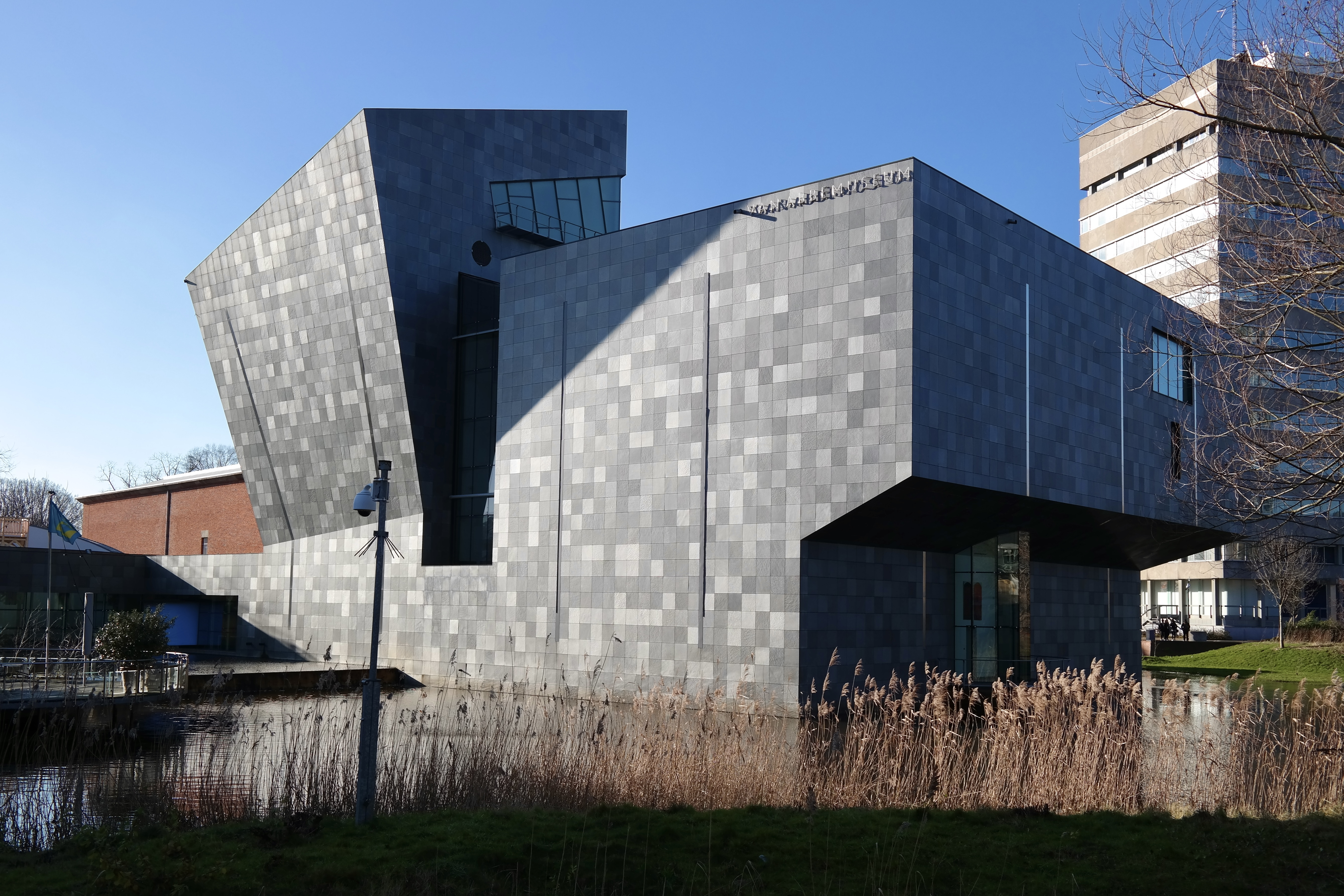
The 2003 extension. View to the southeast, with the City Hall (background right).

As the building had become far too small for modern demands, a new extension to the building, including a 27-metre-high (89 ft) tower, was designed by Abel Cahen; it was inaugurated in 2003 by Queen Beatrix.

== Collection ==
The original collection contained works by Jan Sluijters, Carel Willink and Isaac Israëls amongst others, mostly Dutch and Belgian contemporary works. The museum also bought other artworks from founder Henri van Abbe before his death in 1940. The collection developed most under the directorships of Jean Leering, Edy de Wilde and Rudi Fuchs. While De Wilde bought the classical modernist works by Picasso and similar artists, Fuchs, director from 1975 to 1987, bought works from artists of his own generation, in particular conceptual work from the US and German painting. It was Leering, however, who was responsible for acquiring the El Lissizsky's, working with Ilse Vordemberge-Leda, the widow of the painter Friedrich Vordemberge-Gildewart, and the seller of the collection.

Charles Esche, director from 2004 to 2024, pursued a more geographically diverse collecting policy concentrating on works from central and eastern Europe including Nedko Solakov, Mladen Stilinovic, Wilhelm Sasnal, Artur Zmijewski as well as video works by Israeli artist Yael Bartana. The museum is also internationally renowned for having one of the largest collections of works by El Lissitzky. More recent acquisitions include pieces by Pablo Picasso, Wassily Kandinsky and Piet Mondrian. The Van Abbemuseum also houses the collection of posters made by the Situationist Jacqueline de Jong in Paris during May 1968.

== Administration ==
The first director was W.J.A. Visser, from 1936. He remained director until the start of the Second World War but stood down as he could not agree with the policy of the German invaders. He retook the position for a short while after the war, but in 1946 Edy de Wilde took over.

During De Wilde's directorship, various cubist and modernist artworks were purchased. This included Femme en vert by Picasso (for around 110.000 Dutch guilders, at the same a considerable sum) and Hommage à Apollinaire by Marc Chagall. Nevertheless, De Wilde received criticism: the sons of van Van Abbe believed that De Wilde was showing too few of their father's works. De Wilde disagreed and continued with his one direction. He remained director until 1964, after which Jean Leering became his successor.

Leering tried during his directorate to present less elitist art and heighten the museum's social engagement. He also wanted to engage a younger audience in contemporary art by inviting secondary school pupils to attend private viewings and to initiate discussion over the recent acquisitions. This was the context in which the blue monochrome canvas by Yves Klein was purchased. Leering remained director until 1973, from which date Rudi Fuchs took over. Fuchs continued until 1987 when Jan Debbaut succeeded him.

Under the directorship of Debbaut, the museums's greatest changes took place, largely thanks to the increase in exhibition space through the construction of a renovated building. Once the extended building was opened, Debbaut retired and was replaced in 2004 by Charles Esche. In May 2025 Defne Ayas was announced as the incoming directors taking the reins on September 15, 2025.

The museum had 96,750 visitors in 2011 and 98,100 visitors in 2012.

== Gallery ==
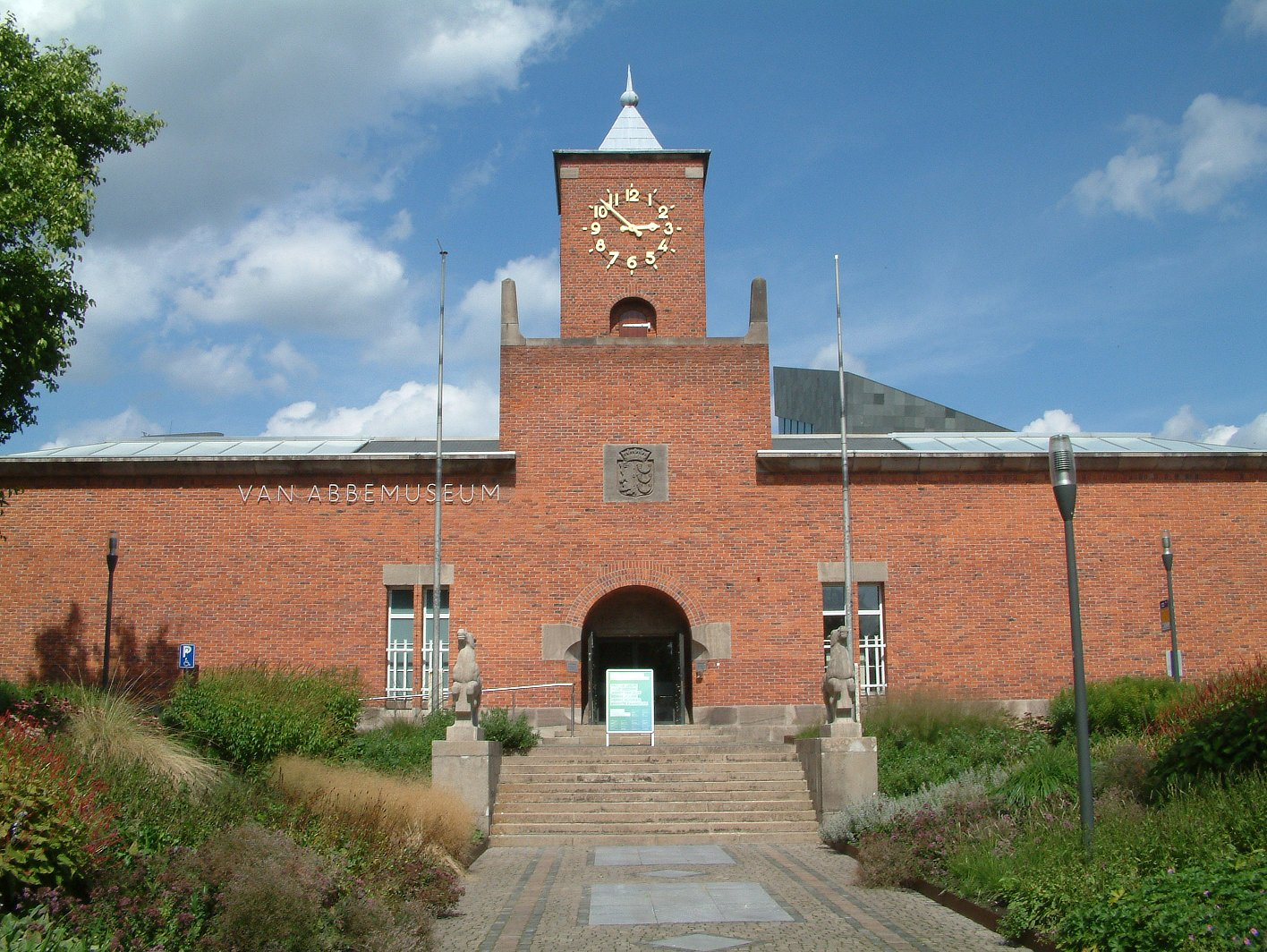
Main entrance

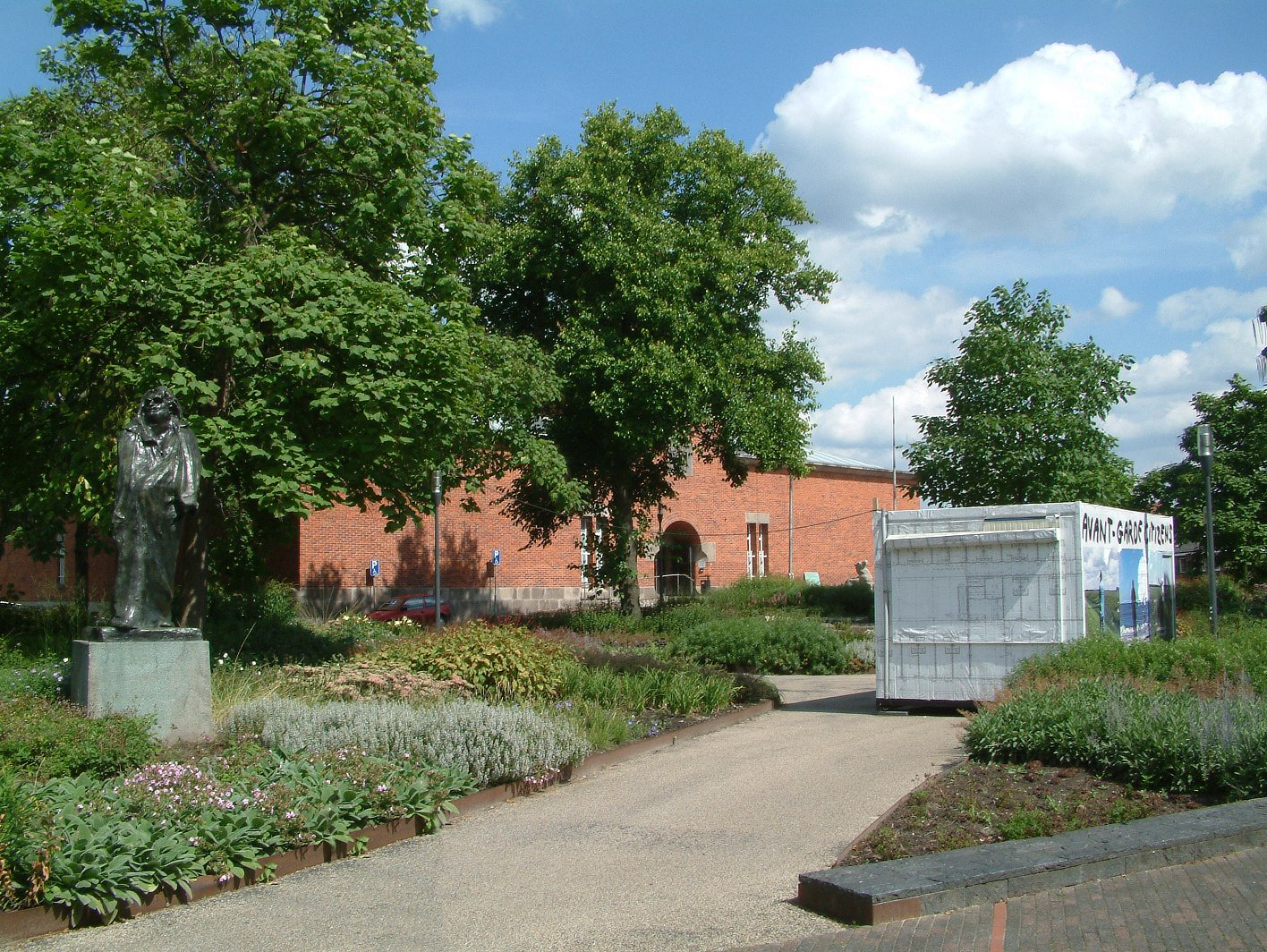

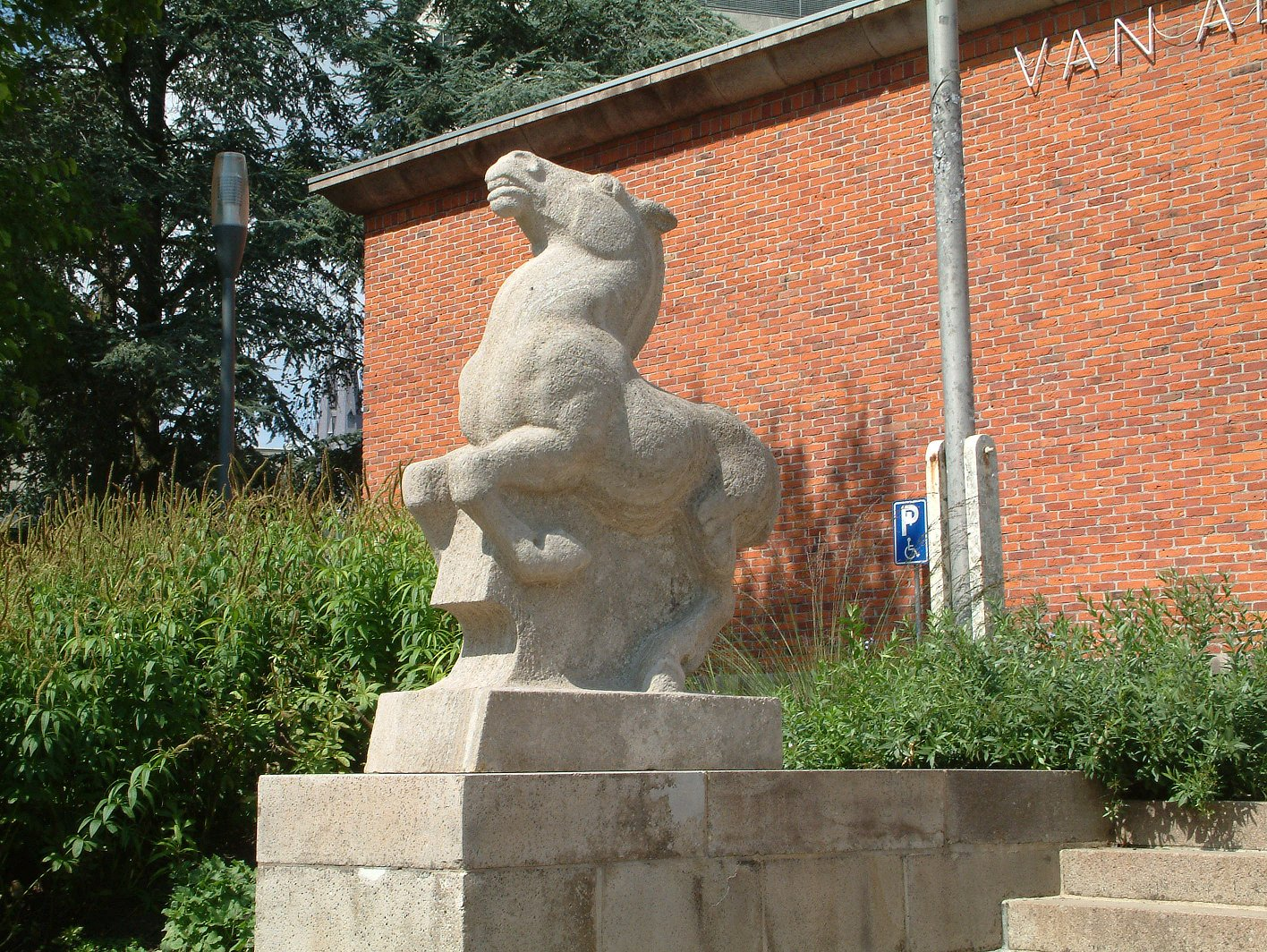
Entrance of old buildings to new buildings, Rädecker John.

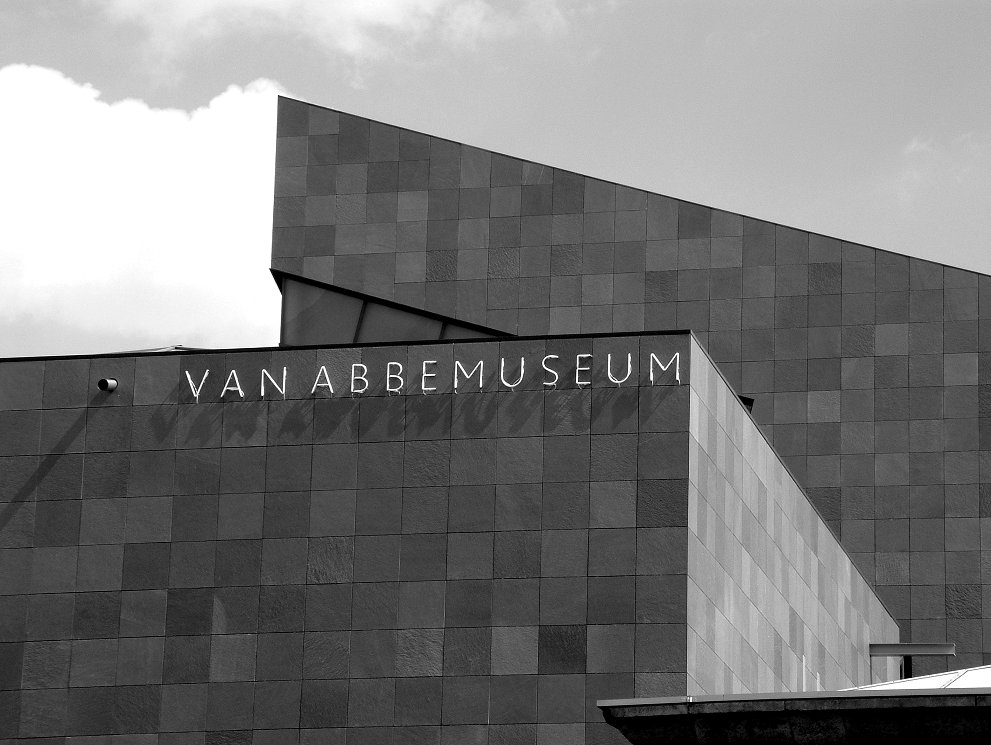
Part of the new wing

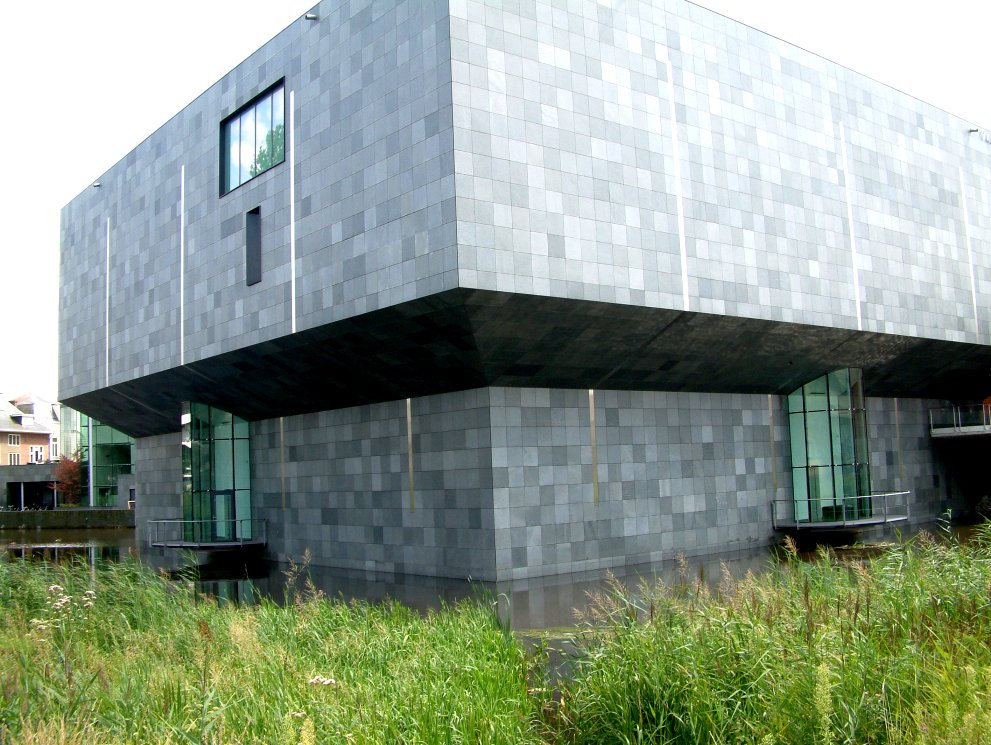

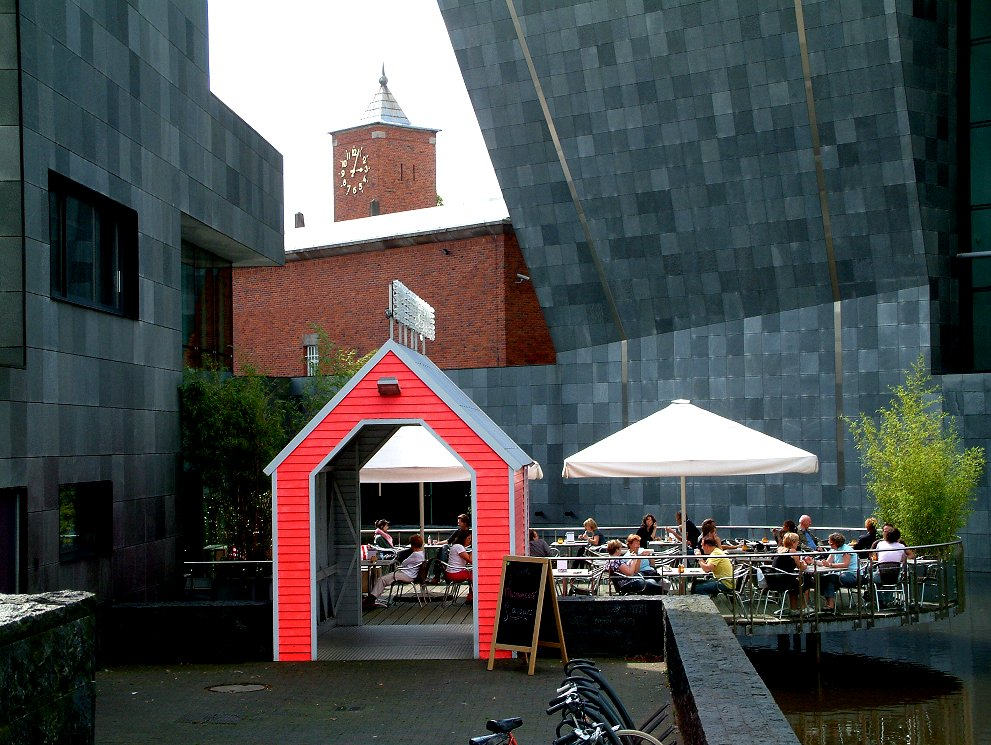
New and old buildings. In the foreground of the house Körmeling

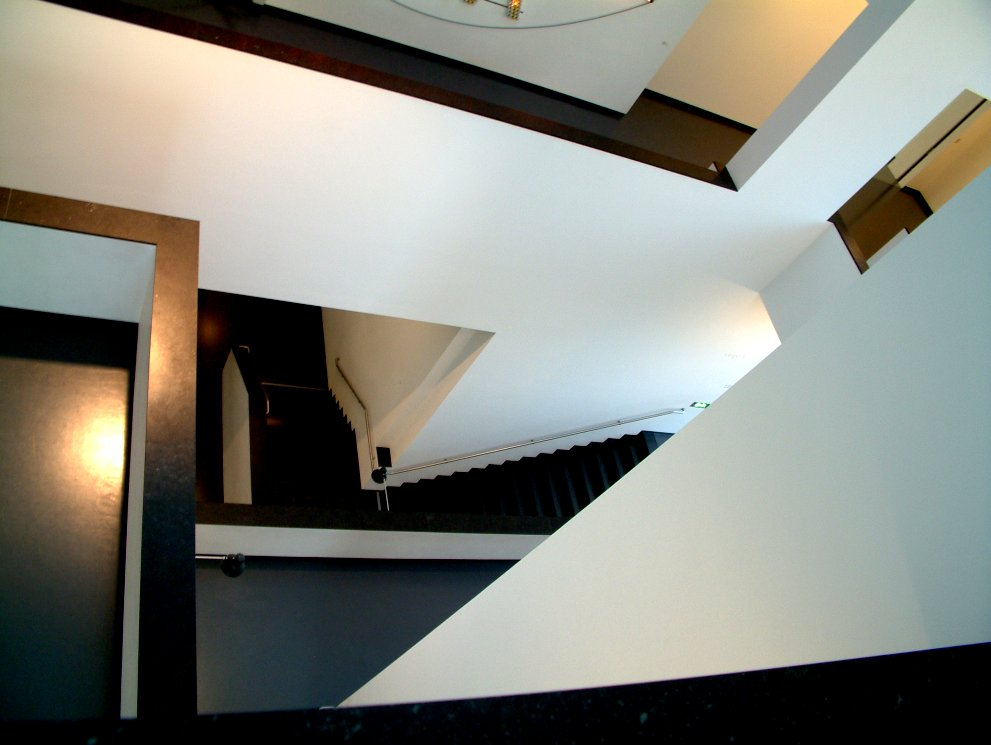
See-through five floors of the building

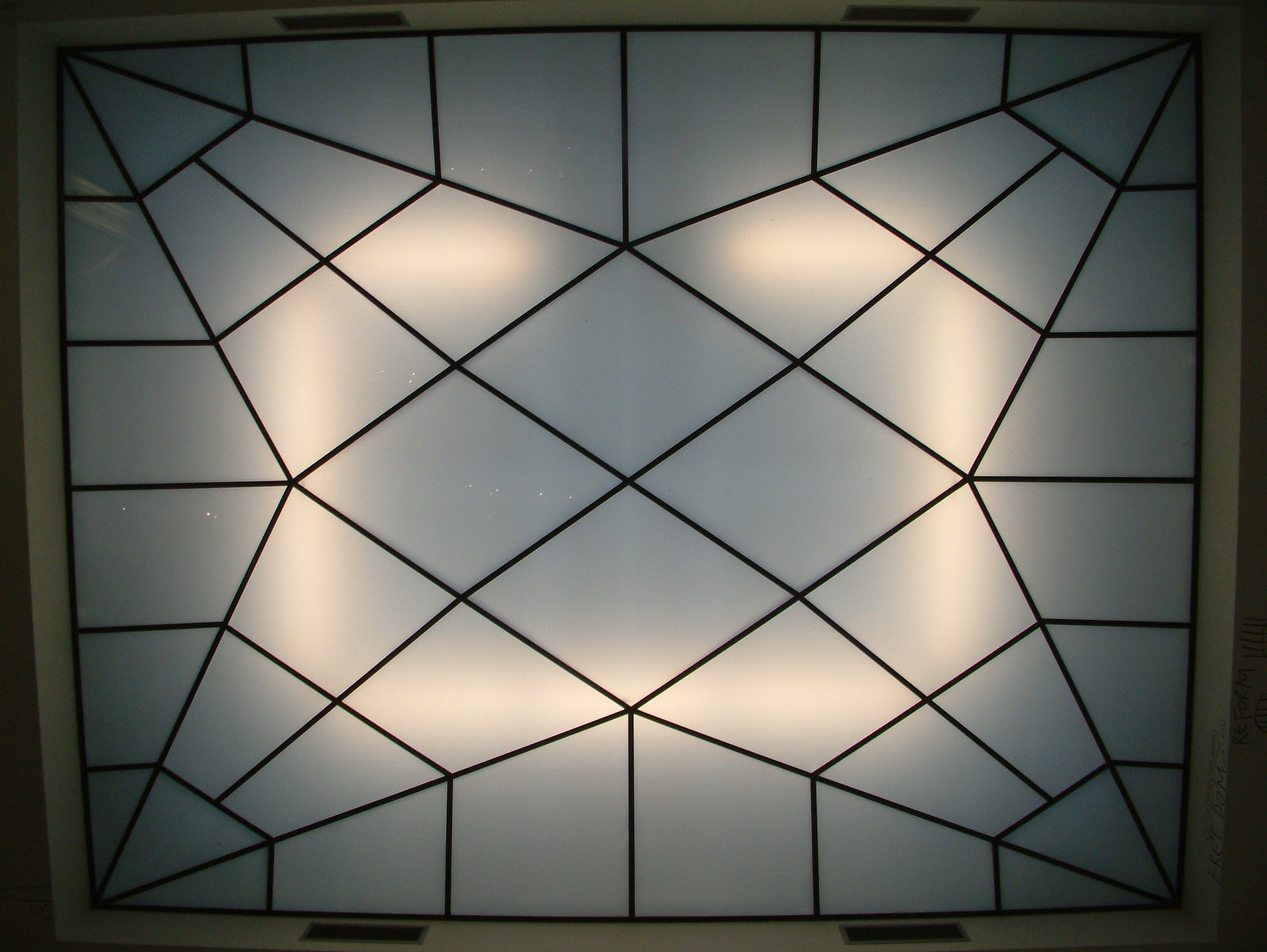

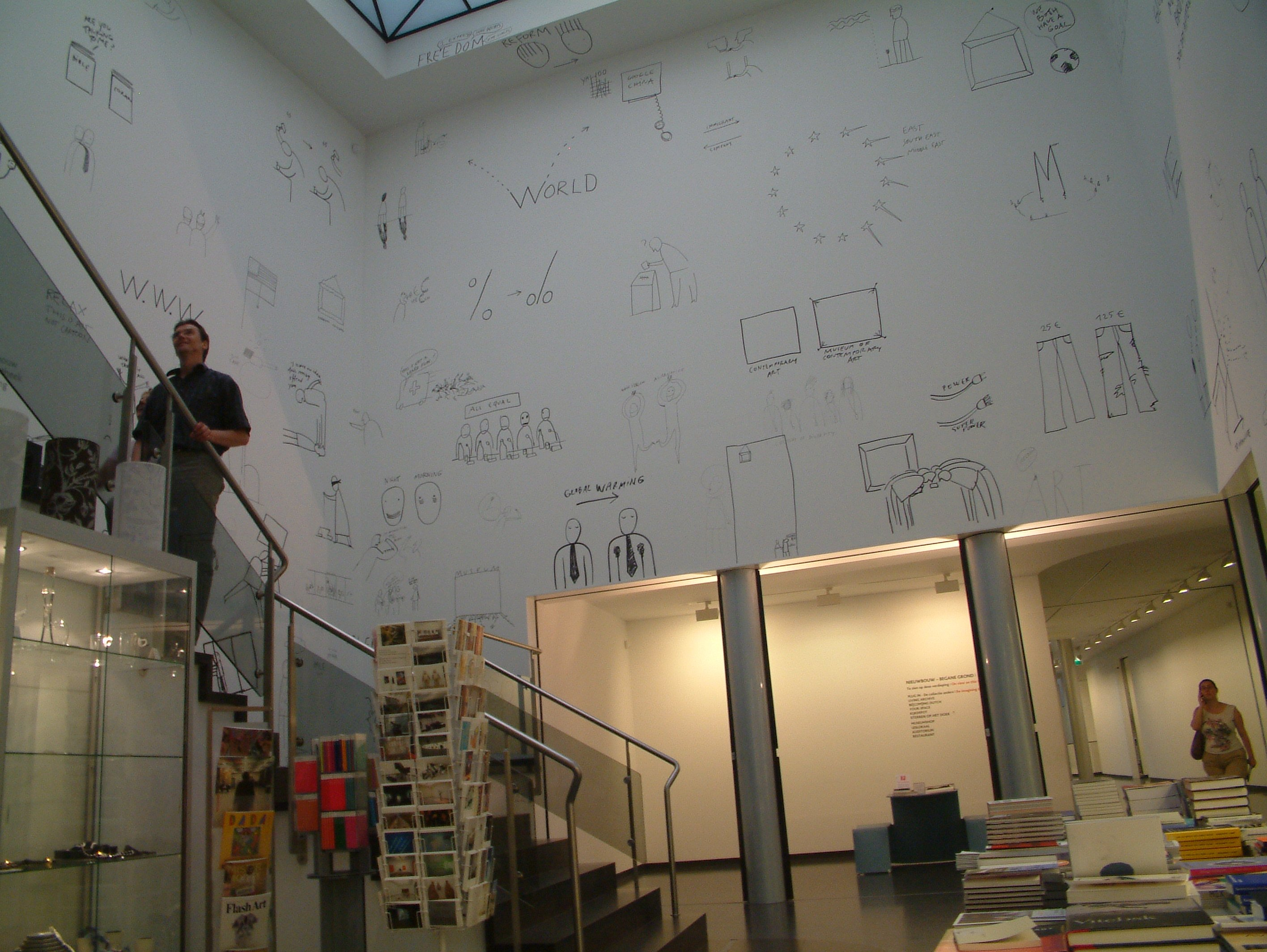

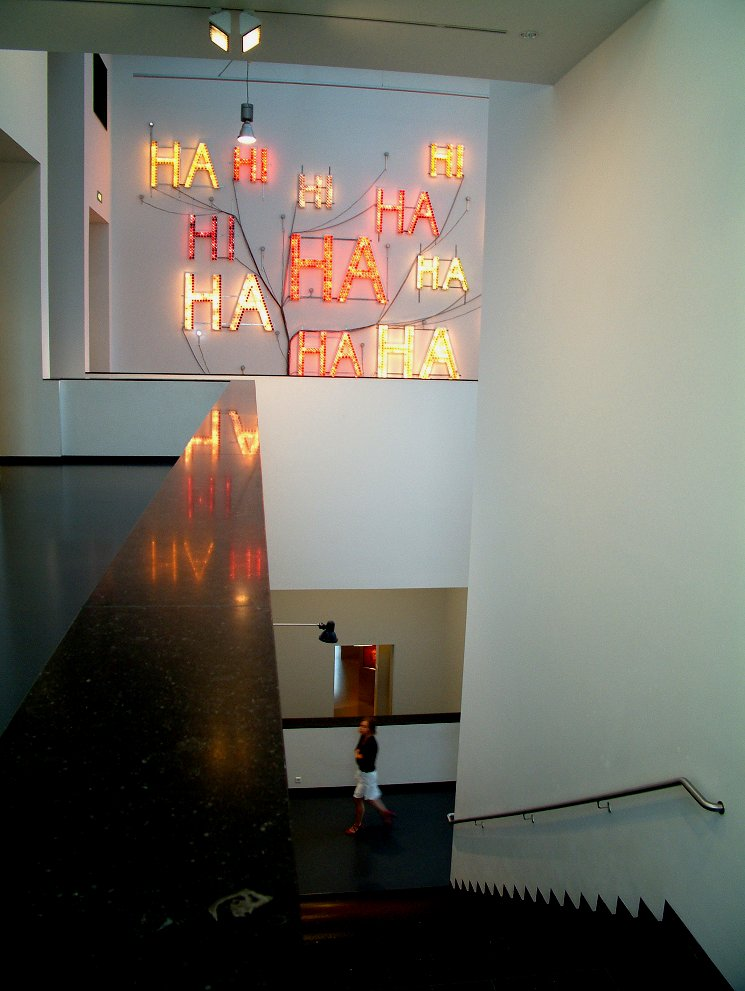

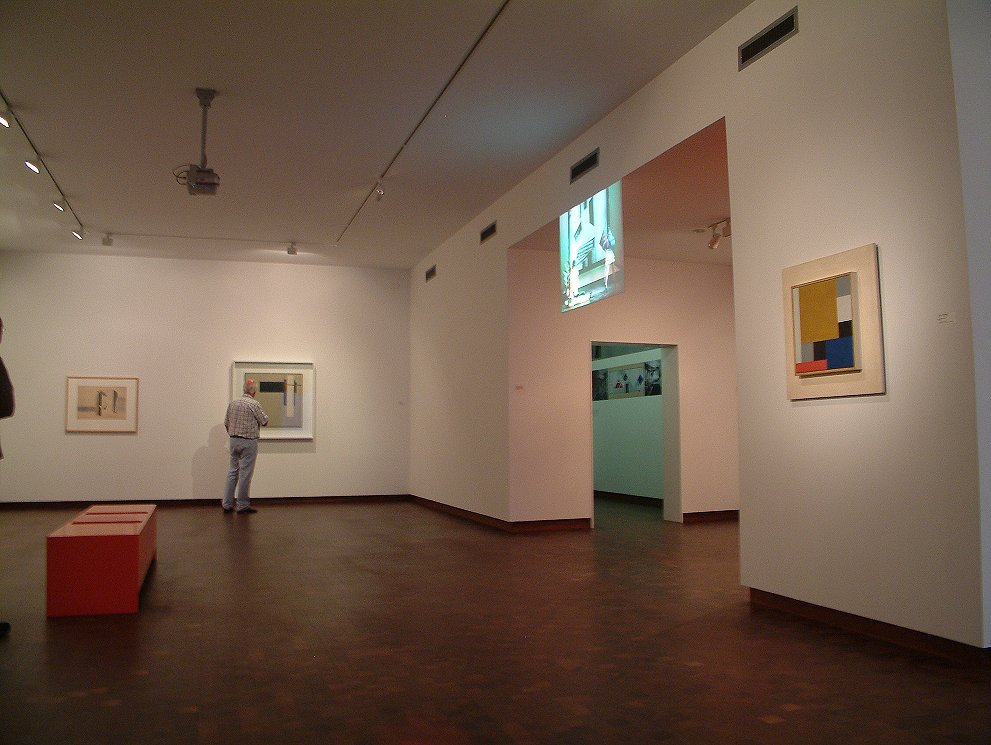

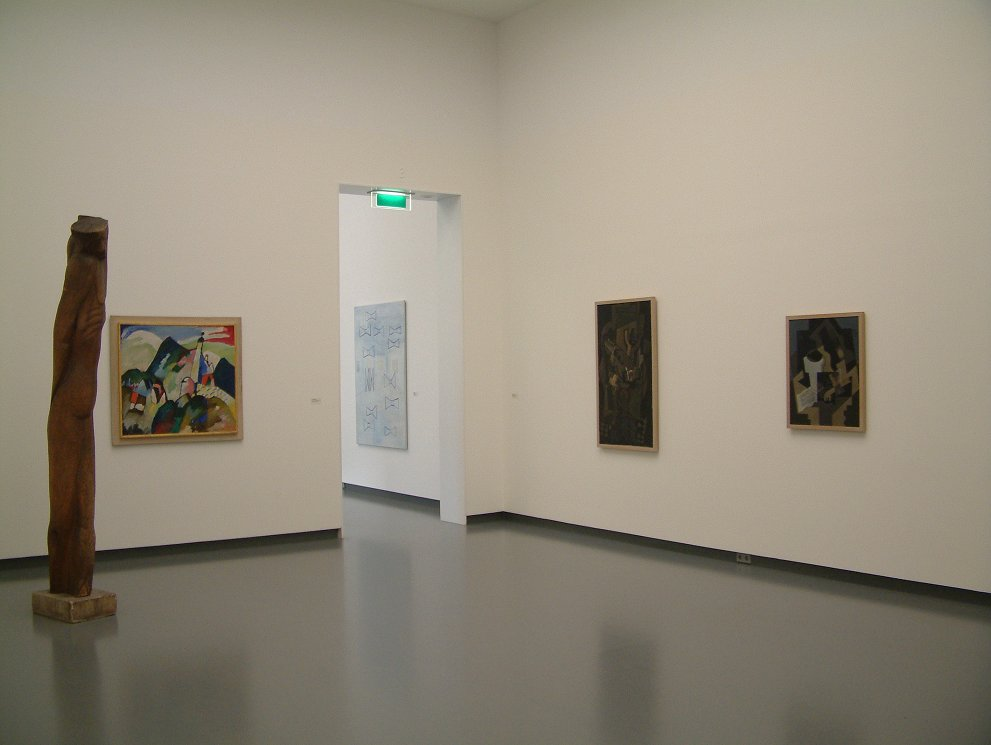
