= Henri van Abbe =

Dutch entrepreneur (1880-1940)

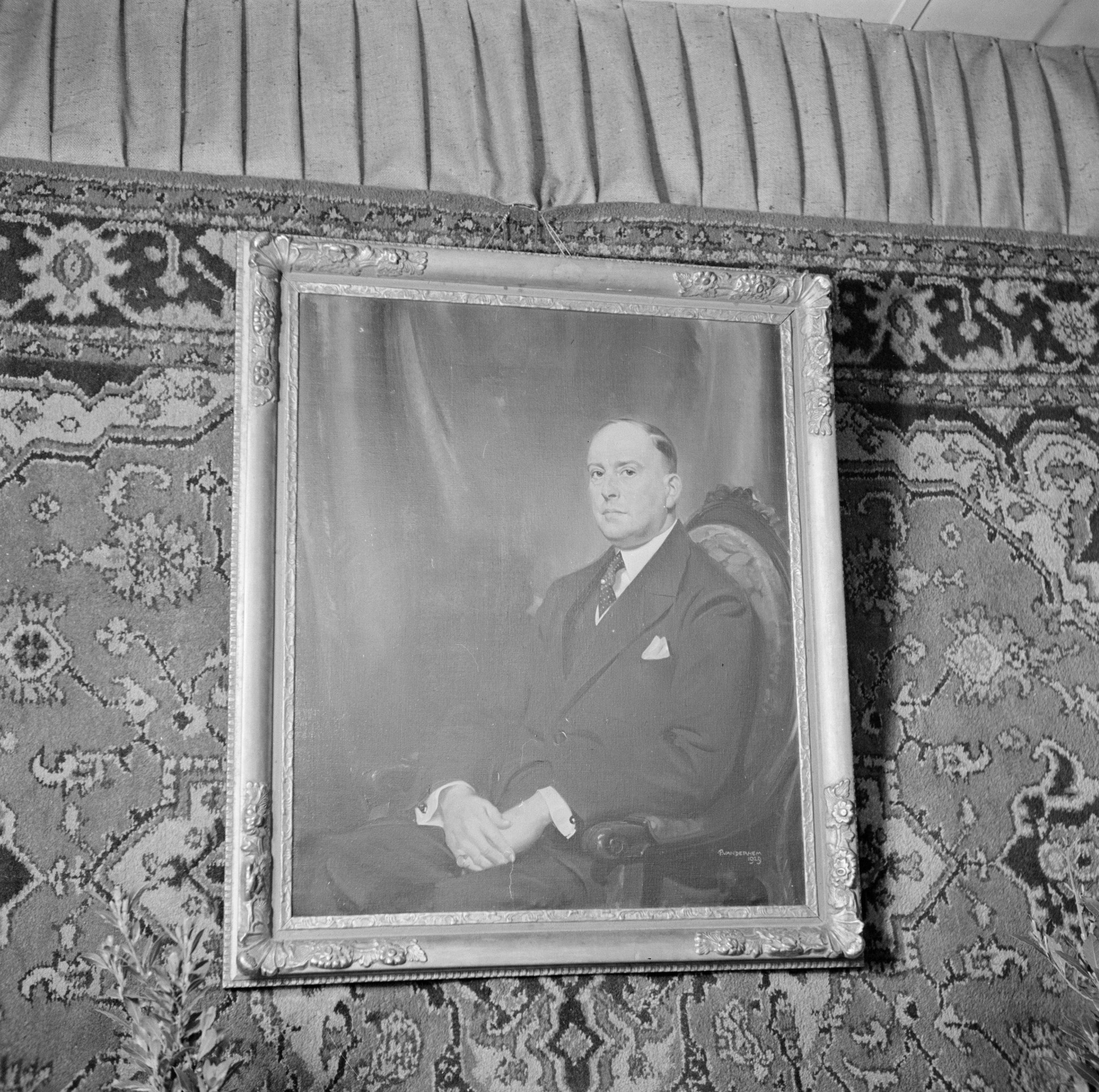
Portrait of Henri van Abbe by Pieter van der Hem (1929)

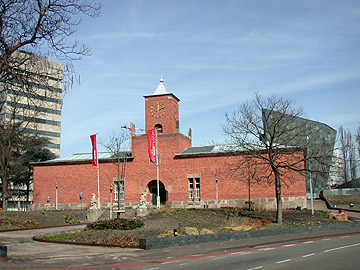
Van Abbemuseum in Eindhoven

Henri Jacob van Abbe (Dutch pronunciation: [ˈɦɛnri ˈjaːkɔp fɑn ˈɑbə]; (Note: In isolation, van is pronounced [vɑn].) 8 January 1880 – 18 November 1940) was a Dutch tobacco industrialist and art collector. He is the founder of the Van Abbemuseum in Eindhoven.

== Life ==
Henri Jacob van Abbe was born on 8 January 1880 in Amsterdam, in the Netherlands.

Van Abbe was a cigar manufacturer in Eindhoven. In 1900, he founded a cigar factory in Amsterdam, which later expanded. A committed art collector, he founded the Van Abbemuseum in Eindhoven in 1936 and made a major donation to it.

In the 1930s, he regularly travelled to Belgium with Tinus van Bakel, a colleague in the tobacco trade and an art collector, to acquire works of art. In 1936, one of the places they visited was the artists' colony of Sint-Martens-Latem.

Van Abbe died on 18 November 1940 in Eindhoven.
