= Roding, Germany =

Roding
- Town
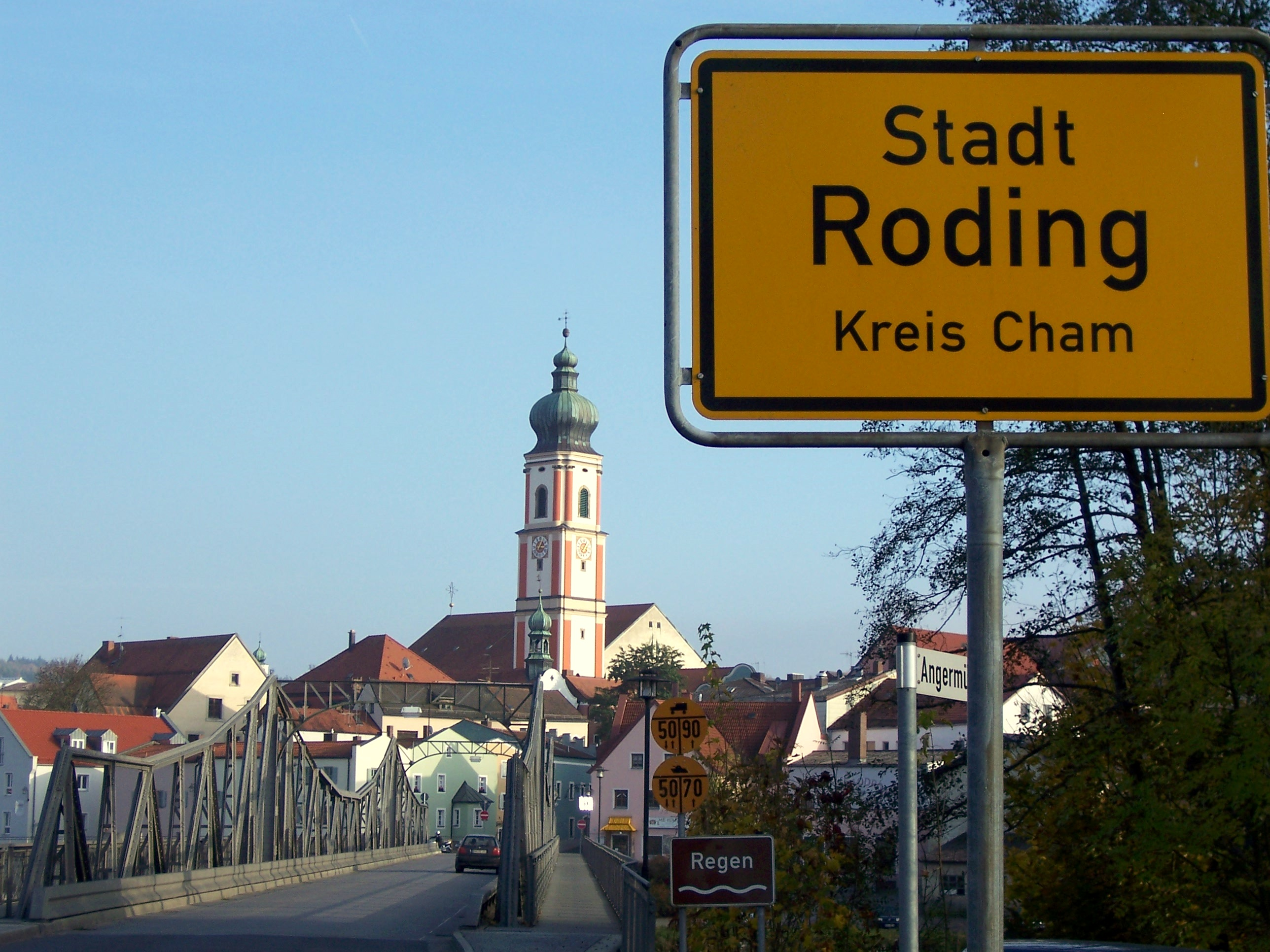
- Roding and the bridge over Regen River

- Coat of arms

- Location of Roding within Cham district
- Interactive map of Roding
- Location within Germany Location within Bavaria
- Coordinates: 49°12′N 12°31′E
- Country: Germany
- State: Bavaria
- Admin. region: Oberpfalz
- District: Cham
- Subdivisions: 16 Ortsteile

Government
  - Mayor (2020–26): Alexandra Riedl (FW)

Area
  - Total: 119.63 km^{2} (46.19 sq mi)
- Elevation: 369 m (1,211 ft)

Population (2025-12-31)
  - Total: 13,060
  - Density: 109.2/km^{2} (282.7/sq mi)
- Time zone: UTC+01:00 (CET)
  - Summer (DST): UTC+02:00 (CEST)
- Postal codes: 93426
- Dialling codes: 0 94 61
- Vehicle registration: CHA, KÖZ, ROD, WÜM
- Website: www.roding.de

Roding (German: [ˈʁoːdɪŋ]) is a town in the district of Cham, in Bavaria, Germany, near the Czech border.

== First mayors since 1945 ==
Name	Party	from	to
Jakob Wittmann		1945	1948
Josef Brantl	Free voters	1948	1964
Ludolf Stuiber	CSU	1964	1977
Eduard Bäumel	Free voters	1977	1996
Franz Reichold	CSU	1996	2020
Alexandra Riedl	Free voters	2020	incumbent

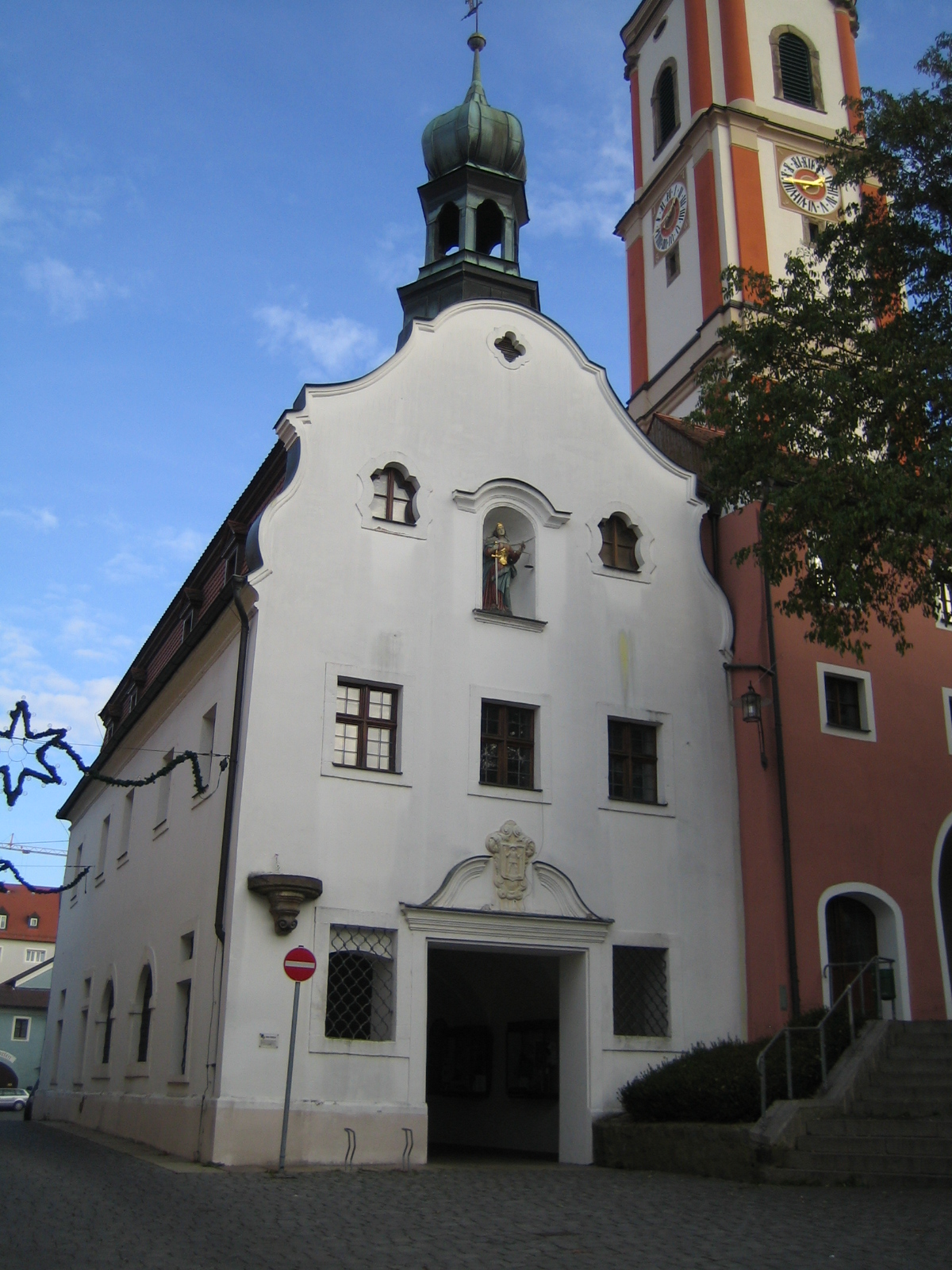
Old town hall Roding

== Sons and daughters of the town ==
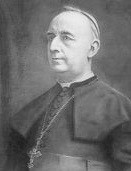
Louis Mary Fink around 1900

- Louis Mary Fink OSB (1834-1904), Benedictine and Bishop of the Archbishopric of Kansas City
- Heimrad Prem (1934-1978), painter, member of the artist group SPUR (1958-1965)

== Personalities who lived / worked on the ground ==
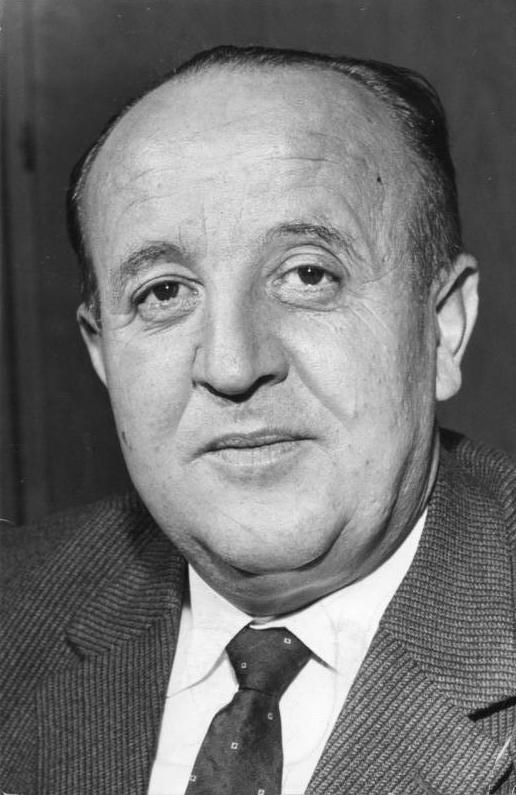
Hermann Höcherl in 1961

- Hermann Höcherl (1912-1989), CSU politician, former Federal Minister of the Interior
