= Paul Adam (French novelist) =

French novelist (1862–1920)

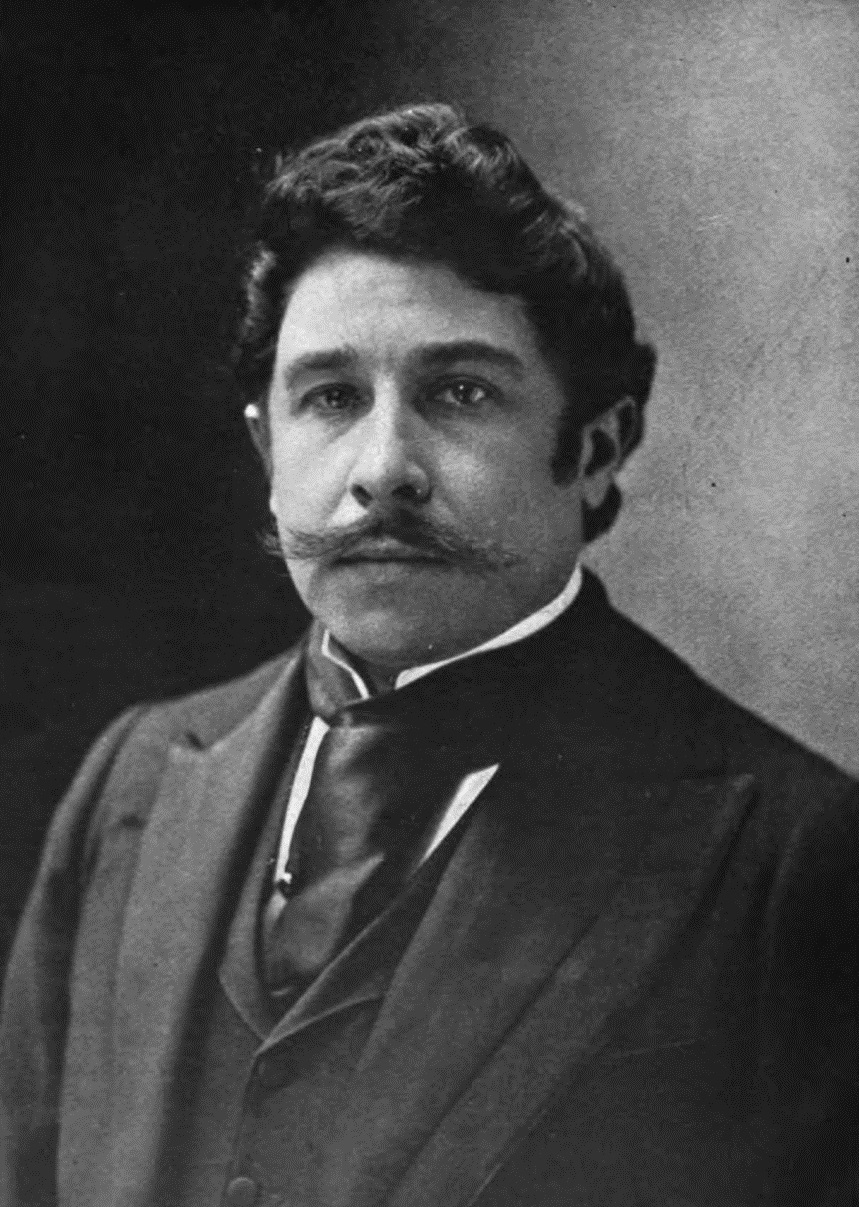
Paul Adam before 1904; Photo by Nadar

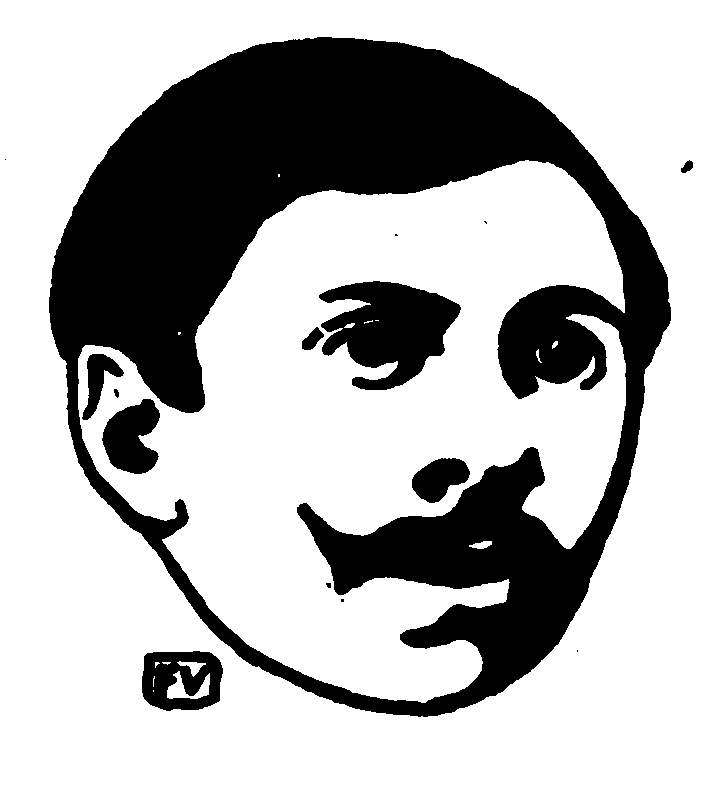
Paul Adam, woodcut by Félix Vallotton

Paul Auguste Marie Adam (7 December 1862 – 1 January 1920) was a French novelist who became an early proponent of Symbolism in France, and one of the founders of the Symbolist review Le Symboliste. He was a prominent writer in Montmartre's anarchist movement.

== Career ==
Adam's first novel, Chair molle ("Soft Flesh"), was the story of a prostitute in the Naturalist manner, which led to him being prosecuted for immorality before the Cour d'assises and sentenced to a fortnight in prison and a 500-franc fine. Together with Jean Moréas, he co-wrote Les Demoiselles Goubert, a novel that marked the transition to Symbolism in French literature. His Lettres de Malaisie (1897) was speculative fiction about politics in the future. He also wrote a series of historical novels that dealt with the period of the Napoleonic Wars and their aftermath; the first installment in the series, La Force, was published in 1899. It was followed by L'enfant d'Austerlitz (1901), La ruse (1902) and Au soleil de Juillet (1903). His work was part of the literature event in the art competition at the 1912 Summer Olympics.

He was born and died in Paris.

== Works ==
- Chair molle (1885)
- Soi (1886)
- Les Demoiselles Goubert (with Jean Moréas, 1886)
- Le Thé chez Miranda (with Jean Moréas, 1886)
- La glèbe (1887)
- Les Volontés merveilleuses: Être (1888)
- Les Volontés merveilleuses: L'essence de soleil (1890)
- Les Volontés merveilleuses: en décor (1890)
- L'Époque: Le Vice filial (1891)
- L'Époque: Robes rouges (1891)
- L'Époque: Les Cœurs utiles (1892)
- L'Automne (1893, a censored play)
- Le Conte futur (1893)
- Critique des mœurs (1893)
- Les Images sentimentales (1893)
- Princesses byzantines (1893)
- La Parade amoureuse (1894)
- Le Mystère des foules (1895)
- Les Cœurs nouveaux (1896)
- La Force du mal (1896)
- L'Année de Clarisse (1897, illustrated by Gaston Darbour)
- La bataille d'Uhde (1897)
- Le Vice filial (1898, illustrated by Jan Dědina)
- Le Temps et la Vie:
1. La Force (1899)
2. L'Enfant d'Austerlitz (1901)
3. La Ruse, 1827-1828 (1903)
4. Au soleil de juillet, 1829-1830 (1903)
- Basile et Sophia (1901)
- Lettres de Malaisie (1898)
- Le Troupeau de Clarisse (1904)
- Le Serpent noir (1905)
- Vues d'Amérique (1906)
- Clarisse et l'homme heureux (1907)
- La Morale des Sports (1907)
- La cité prochaine (1908)
- Les Impérialismes et la morale des peuples (1908)
- Le Malaise du monde latin (1910)
- Le Trust (1910)
- Contre l’Aigle (1910)
- Stéphanie (1913)
- Le Lion d'Arras (1919)
- Notre Carthage (1922)
- Dieu (1924, published posthumously in La Phalange)
