= Michael P. Daley =

- Born: Chicago, United States
- Occupations: Author, cultural historian
- Writing career
- Language: English
- Genres: Crime, true crime, politics, art
- Website: michaelpdaley.com

Michael P. Daley is an American author and cultural historian. Daley's work primarily concerns crime, subcultures, politics, and art. He is a former counterculture archivist and political news editor.

== Career ==
From 2009 to 2014, Daley was employed at Boo-Hooray as an archivist engaged in the preservation of counterculture and political movements. During his time at Boo-Hooray, he facilitated the sale of cultural collections to institutions such as Yale's Beinecke Rare Book & Manuscript Library, Cornell's Rare & Manuscript Collections, Columbia's Rare Book & Manuscript Library, University of Miami's Special Collections, and Georgetown's Lauinger Library. He has also curated exhibitions on William S. Burroughs, Ed Wood, private press vinyl, science-fiction zines, and Civil War photography in cities like New York City, Paris, London, and Montreal.

One of Daley's first works as an author was That's Life: The O.L. Jaggers Story (Boo-Hooray, 2011) a short biographical pamphlet which talked about the legal struggles of a cult L.A. preacher once famed for his UFO-themed sermons. Daley has also worked as an editor for books like Feel the Music: The Psychedelic Worlds of Paul Major (Anthology Editions, 2017), Flying Saucers Are Real! (Anthology Editions, 2016), The Situationist Times facsimile edition (Boo-Hooray, 2012), and Houston Rap Tapes (Sinecure Books, 2013).

=== First To Knock ===
In 2017, Daley founded First To Knock, a small press publisher and sometime record label. First To Knock titles are irregularly published and include Echoes of a Natural World: Tales of the Strange & Estranged (2020), a weird fiction collection that featured contemporary fiction by Daley and others, alongside new translations of French authors such as Joris-Karl Huysmans, Marcel Schwob, and Jean Lorrain.

=== Bobby BlueJacket: The Tribe, The Joint, The Tulsa Underworld ===
In 2018, Daley’s Bobby BlueJacket: The Tribe, The Joint, The Tulsa Underworld was published. Released on Daley’s First To Knock imprint, the book is a biography of a Native American career thief and safecracker who became a prison journalist and ultimately an Eastern Shawnee activist. Daley researched and wrote Bobby BlueJacket over a period of six years. Referencing the microhistorical approach in the book's introduction, Bobby BlueJacket broaches larger questions about United States history through its specific focus on a single, relatively unknown individual. Ron Padgett, an award-winning author and poet, regarded the book as a "fascinating and richly detailed biography and an intimate portrait of complex emotional and intellectual life". Jack Womack, a Philip K. Dick awardee described BlueJacket as: "Insightful, angry, straightforward, reminiscent of the subterranean classic You Can't Win by Jack Black." Daley's BlueJacket was featured in Los Angeles Review of Books, Tulsa World, Weird History, Bustle, This Land Press, and Public Radio Tulsa/NPR. The book was nominated for best non-fiction work for the 30th annual Oklahoma Book Awards.

=== Enjoy The Experience: Homemade Records 1958–1992 ===
Daley also co-authored and edited Enjoy The Experience: Homemade Records 1958–1992 (Sinecure Books, 2013), which was featured in the BBC, Vice, and was called "the greatest music book of the year" by Los Angeles Magazine.

== As editor ==
- Echoes of a Natural World: Tales of the Strange & Estranged (2020)
- Feel the Music: The Psychedelic Worlds of Paul Major (2017)
- The Flying Saucers Are Real! (Anthology Editions, 2016)
- The Situationist Times facsimile edition (Boo-Hooray, 2012)
- Houston Rap Tapes
- Ed Wood's Sleaze Paperbacks (2011)

== Bibliography ==
- Bobby BlueJacket: The Tribe, The Joint, The Tulsa Underworld (2018)
- Enjoy The Experience: Homemade Records 1958–1992 (2013)
- That's Life: The O.L. Jaggers Story (2011)
