= Hans-Peter Zimmer =

German painter and sculptor (1936–1992)

Hans-Peter Zimmer (23 October 1936 – 5 September 1992) was a German painter and sculptor. He was born in Berlin and studied at the Academy of Fine Arts, Munich.

He formed Gruppe SPUR in 1957 with the painters Heimrad Prem, Helmut Sturm and the sculptor Lothar Fischer. After a joint exhibition at the Pavillon im Alten Botanischen Garten in Munich, they met the Danish artist and philosopher Asger Jorn, who linked them up with the Galerie Van de Loo which exhibited them.

In 1959 the group joined the Situationist International. In 1961 they were banned from the Haus der Kunst (House of Art) by the Bavarian Minister of Culture. In 1962 they were indicted for pornography and blasphemy. They were expelled from the Situationist International that year.

The group SPUR broke up in 1966. In the same year, Zimmer and Helmut Sturm founded Gruppe Geflecht, but Zimmer lost interest in the group activities soon and started a solo career. He completed studies in Hamburg and München. In 1982, he began work as a professor for painting at the HBK Braunschweig. He died in Soltau.
