= Enjoy the Experience =

- Author: Michael P. Daley, Johan Kugelberg and Paul Major
- ISBN: 1938265041

Enjoy the Experience: Homemade Records 1958–1992 is a book co-edited and co-authored by Michael P. Daley, Johan Kugelberg and Paul Major, and published by Sinecure Books in 2013. The book focuses on the music of the late 1950s to the early 1990s and presents the annals of the homemade records mini-industry of that era.

The book forays into the subculture of homemade records and explores how the trend of vanity pressings emerged in this period as a way of outstanding works of music by artists with their own money. Much akin to the self-publishing industry, the subculture was based primarily on the belief of the artists that their music was outstanding and significant enough to reach the public even though their small-scale editions had very limited or no scope of distribution.

== Background ==
The editors and authors of the book have engaged in a search and discovery of these editions in yard sales and thrift stores and even random places and attempted a chronicling of their histories. In an interview with the BBC about the book, Kugelberg talked about their work and their aim of unearthing "the music – and the artworks – created by Americans who may never have made it big – but who at least made a record." With these hidden artworks as the subject and context, the book delves into an extensive study of the subculture.

Talking about their work, Michael P. Daley said in an interview with Vice that "it took over three years to make the actual book. However, the collectors whose archives we dug into have been amassing the contents for several decades." He further added that they even dug through old newspapers and googled through old records to find possible links and thus creating chronologies for the found vinyl and works. It was through this process that they often ended up meeting the actual surviving performers, some of whom even helped in plugging the information gaps and provided insights. Daley recounted that the backstories for the vinyl often had different motives – while some only aimed at popularity, others often used them for money laundering or as souvenirs for live performances.

Enjoy The Experience: Homemade Records 1958–1992 also included a download code for the readers, which allowed downloading of selected tracks mentioned in the book.

== Reception ==
The book has received much critical acclaim by stalwarts and critics in the field, and the publication news has been covered by Esquire, Vice, BBC and more. In the media coverage of the book, Esquire reports that the book received praise from film director Larry Clark. Sasha Frere-Jones, a music critic of The New Yorker, has also provided positive reviews on the book.

Greg Beets of The Austin Chronicle praised the book, writing that, "Enjoy the Experience chronicles the golden age of private pressings with contagious aplomb." Andrew Frisicano of Time Out New York praised the book concept and how it traces the stories behind the creation of those records and their creators along with the study of the recordings themselves.
