= Dimitrios Papadiamantopoulos =

Greek soldier

Dimitrios Papadiamantopoulos (Greek: Δημήτριος Παπαδιαμαντόπουλος; 1813–1877) was a Greek soldier who rose to the rank of major general, and was one of the main leaders of the ousting of King Otto of Greece in 1862.

== Life ==
Dimitrios Papadiamantopoulos was born in Patras in 1813, as the son of Ioannis Papadiamantopoulos, a member of the Philiki Etaireia who was killed during the Fall of Missolonghi in 1826. He was among the first students to enter the Hellenic Army Academy, and graduated in 1832 as an artillery second lieutenant.

He grew to become one of the chief figures of opposition to King Otto of Greece, and became one of the leaders of the king's ouster in the 10 October 1862 Revolution. In the aftermath, he enjoyed great prestige and influence, acquiring the nickname Stratolaos (a combination of the Greek words for 'army' and 'people'). During the brief civil war of June 1863, he led the field artillery to the support of Dimitrios Voulgaris.

After the arrival of King George I of Greece, he was promoted to major general and made aide-de-camp to the new king. He died in Athens during his retirement in 1877.
