= Situationist Times =

International periodical

The Situationist Times ran to six issues edited and published by Jacqueline de Jong between May 1962 and December 1967 in Hengelo (Netherlands), Copenhagen and Paris, in editions of between 1,000 and 2,000.

Contributors include: Theo Wolvecamp, de Jong, Armando, Vanderkamm, Gruppe SPUR, de Boer, Edle Hansen, Singer, Gordon Fazarkely, Max Bucaille, G. Hay, Asger Jorn, P. Schat, Noël Arnaud, Pierre Alechinsky, Boris Vian, and many others.

== No. 3 ==
This issue is the "International British Edition", dedicated to "The Typology of Knots".

== No. 4 ==
This issue deals with labyrinths;

== No. 5 ==
This issues deals with the Ring, the interlaced ring and consequently the Chain.

a letter from Luc d'Heusch,
Mind and Sense by Asger Jorn
Der Kleine Bootsmann (17th century Danish poem)
Art and Orders by Asger Jorn
Regular forms of closed non-orientabe surfaces by Lech Tomaszewski
Extract from Het Verleden van Oost-Europa by Dr. Z. R. Diettrich
Extract from Topology by Patterson
Cosmogonie annulaires, Port d'Anneau and Structure d'Anneau by Max Bucaille
Von den Polyeder zu den gekrümmten Flächen by Professor W. Lietzmann
Origin et géénéologie d'Anneau by Max Bucaille
Forgotten knowledge of the universe in the children's hopscotch by Virtus Schade
L'infini du doigt by Max Bucaille
L'anneau retrouvé - folk tale from Kashmir
Cercles mysterieux by Max Bucaille
Ringsleken en Ringrijden - Children's game
Noeds et dénouments by D. G. Emmerich
Die Legende des Heiligen Oswald
Cinétisations by Pol Bury
What goes up still goes down by Dr Narlikar and Professor Fred Hoyle
Kreisen, Kreissegementen und Wellenlinien usw. by F. van der Waals
Die Parabel des 3 Ringe (Nathan der Weise) Gotthold Ephraim Lessing
Some mathematical aspects by H. C. Doets
Tournures by D. G. Emmerich
Venus de l'île by Mérimée
Extract from the Opera The Labyrinth by Peter Schat
Drawings b Karl Pelgram
Poems and drawings by Jim Ryan
No happy returns for me by E. Mazman

== No. 6 ==
(International Parisian Edition) contains 33 lithographs (Alechinsky, Peter Klasen, Jorn, Wifredo Lam, Roberto Matta, Roland Topor, Antonio Saura.)
