= Ioannis Papadiamantopoulos (major general) =

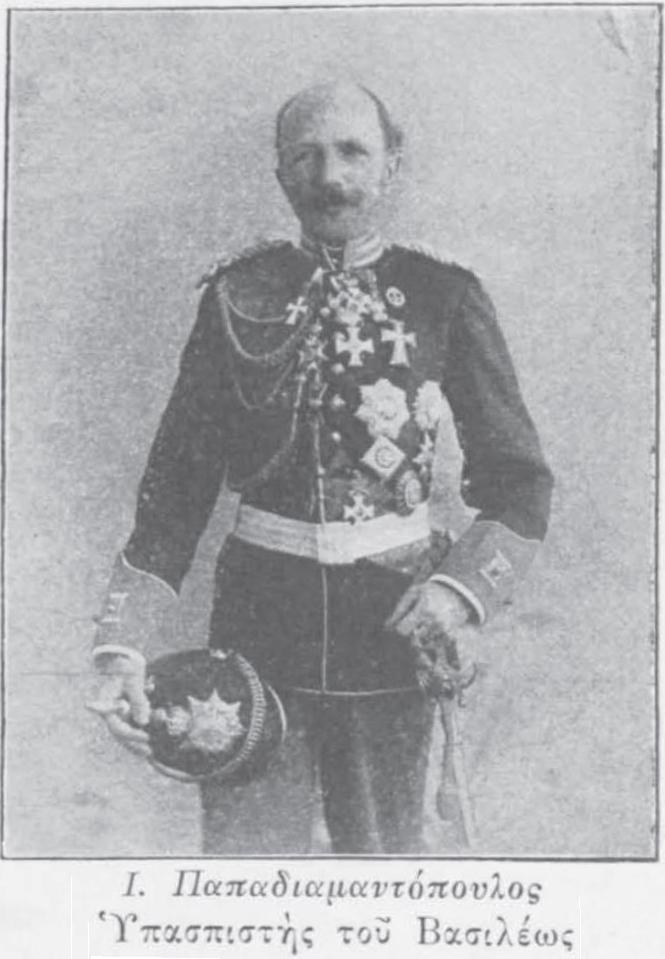
1896 photograph of Papadiamantopoulos as aide-de-camp of King George I

Ioannis Papadiamantopoulos (Greek: Ιωάννης Παπαδιαμαντόπουλος; 1839–1909) was a Greek soldier who rose to the rank of major general, and served as head of the military household of King George I of Greece and briefly Minister of Military Affairs.

== Life ==
Ioannis Papadiamantopoulos was born in Patras on 6 November 1839, as the son of major general Dimitrios Papadiamantopoulos. He entered the Hellenic Army Academy, and graduated in 1862 as a second lieutenant of the engineers.

In 1885–1895, he taught military law at the Army Academy, before being appointed Minister of Military Affairs in the 1895 caretaker cabinet of Nikolaos Deligiannis. He was then made aide-de-camp and head of the military household of King George I of Greece, and then served as the King's privy councillor until his retirement on 1 June 1909. He died at Athens on 27 November of the same year.
