= Heimrad Prem =

German painter and Situationist (1934–1978)

- Born: 27 May 1934; Roding, Oberpfalz, Germany
- Died: 19 February 1978 (aged 43); Munich, West Germany
- Known for: Painting, sculpture

Heimrad Prem (27 May 1934 – 19 February 1978) was a German painter born in Roding, Oberpfalz. From 1949 to 1952 he studied decorative painting at Schwandorf and then studied painting with Josef Oberberger and sculpture with Toni Stadler at the Akademie der Bildenden Künste, Munich until 1956. While studying painting with Ernst Schumacher at the Hochschule der Künste, Berlin, he formed Gruppe SPUR with Lothar Fischer, Helmut Sturm, and Hans-Peter Zimmer. After meeting Asger Jorn, SPUR joined the Situationist International.

In 1960 he won a scholarship of the Kulturpreises im Bundesverband der Deutschen Industrie, Cologne. From 1960 to 1962 he co-edited the magazine SPUR. In 1961 he visited Orkelljunga, Sweden with Sturm, Zimmer and Dieter Kunzelmann staying with Jørgen Nash. In 1962 the SPUR group was expelled from the Situationist International, but they continued to work with Nash and others. In 1963 he worked on the SPUR collaborative works: "Canale Grande Crescente" for the exhibition "Visione e Colore" in the Palazzo Grassi, Venice, the SPUR-Bau joint contribution to the exhibition "Nouveaux Espaces", Biennale Paris, and the "SPUR room" in the country house of Willi Bleicher with Munich.

His first solo exhibition in the Galerie van de Loo, Munich was also in 1963. In 1965 the group SPUR fused with Wir to form the group Geflecht (Network). After a short stay in South Sweden, Prem organised the organization of "white celebration" near Munich and began to paint under the influence of drugs.

After his first suicide attempt in 1971 he traveled in Italy, Turkey and Iran. In 1975 he became a joint founder of the artists' community Kollektiv Herzogstrasse. He became a lecturer at the winter academy in the Schloss Kißlegg. In 1976 he had a special exhibition at the Haus der Kunst, Munich. The following year he exhibited in Copenhagen.

Following this, he continued to exhibit work mainly in Germany.

Heimrad Prem committed suicide in 1978 in Munich.
