= Second Situationist International =

Scandinavian artist collective

- Andra Situationistiska Internationalen
- Abbreviation: Second SI, Nashists
- Formation: 1962
- Dissolved: 1970s
- Type: Avant-garde artistic and revolutionary collective
- Legal status: Defunct
- Headquarters: Drakabygget farm, Örkelljunga, Skåne, Sweden
- Key people: Jørgen Nash; Jacqueline de Jong; Ansgar Elde; Jens Jørgen Thorsen; Hardy Strid; Gordon Fazakerley; Stefan Larsson; Patrick O'Brien

The Second Situationist International were a small group of situationists (the "Nashists") who broke away from the Situationist International (SI). Jørgen Nash identifies the first manifestation of the group as a leaflet signed by himself along with Jacqueline de Jong and Ansgar Elde, shortly after the group Seven Rebels was formed at Situationist Bauhaus at Asger Jorn's farm Drakabygget in southern Sweden.

Before the rupture with the SI, Jorn, who sided with the SI against Nash, emphasised situlogy, "the transformative morphology of the unique."

Howard Slater describes the break between the "Parisian" and the "Scandinavian" tendencies as amounting to "a conflict between a conceptual and an expressionist approach, or, to echo Jorn's two tendencies of situlogy, a conflict between the ludic and the analytical," and quotes the Drakabygget Declaration:

The Franco-Belgian Situationists base themselves on the same principles as Pascal, Descartes ... action precedes emotion. Emotion is a primary non-reflective intelligence: passionate thought/thinking passion. ... We do not always distinguish between theory and practice. We intend to produce our theories after the event. ... The French work exactly the other way round. They want everything straight before they start and everybody has to line up correctly.

The Drakabygget Declaration was the founding document of the Second Situationist International, which appeared in the Situationist Times No. 2, 1962.

The declaration was signed by Jørgen Nash, Jens Jørgen Thorsen, Gordon Fazakerley, Hardy Strid, Stefan Larsson, Ansgar Elde, Jacqueline de Jong, and Patrick O'Brien, following their expulsion from the Situationist International.

The contributors to Situationist Antinational were all associated with the Second Situationist International.

== See also ==
- Anti-art
- Stewart Home
- Situationist Antinational
