= Renee Nele =

German artist (born 1932)

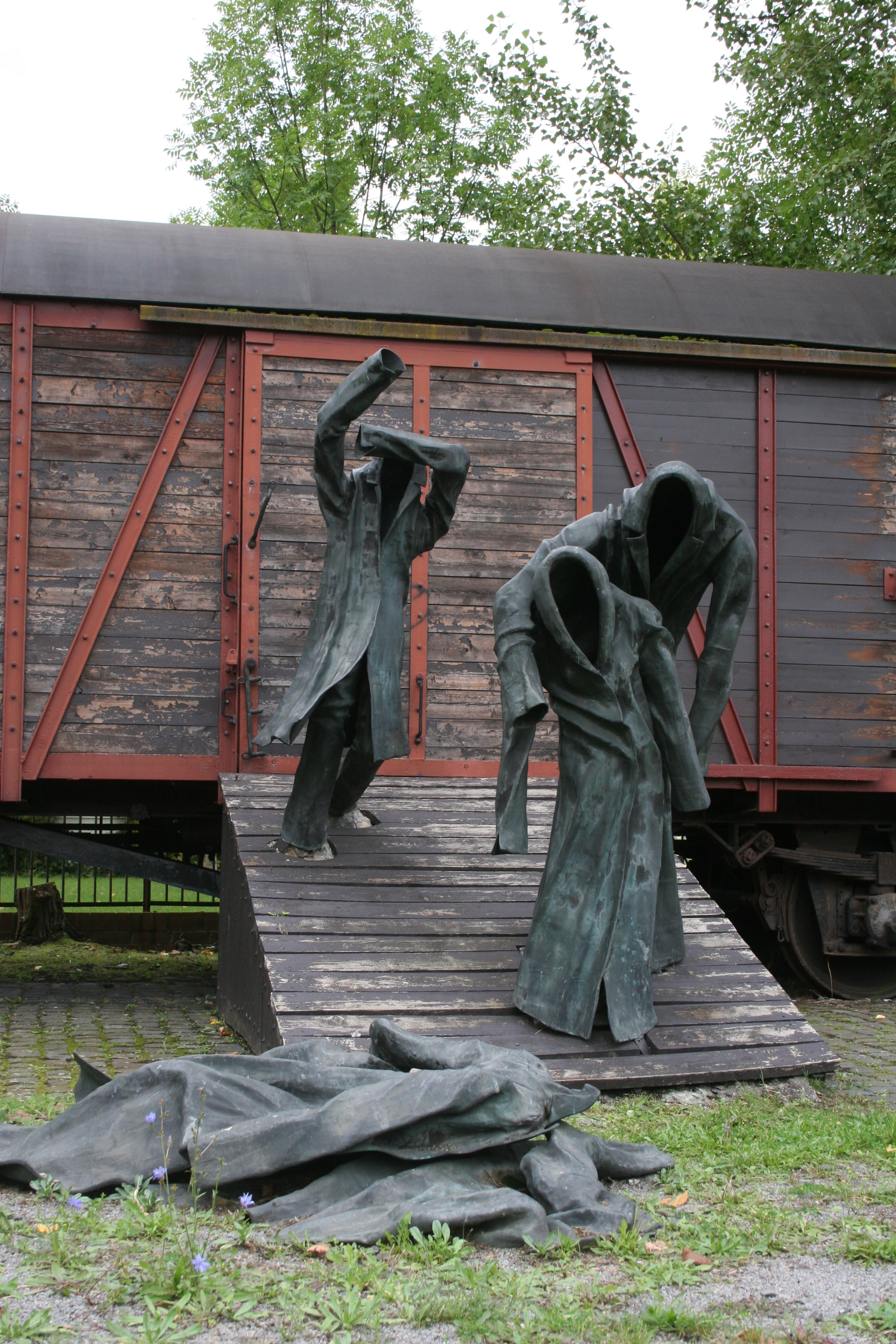
Die Rampe

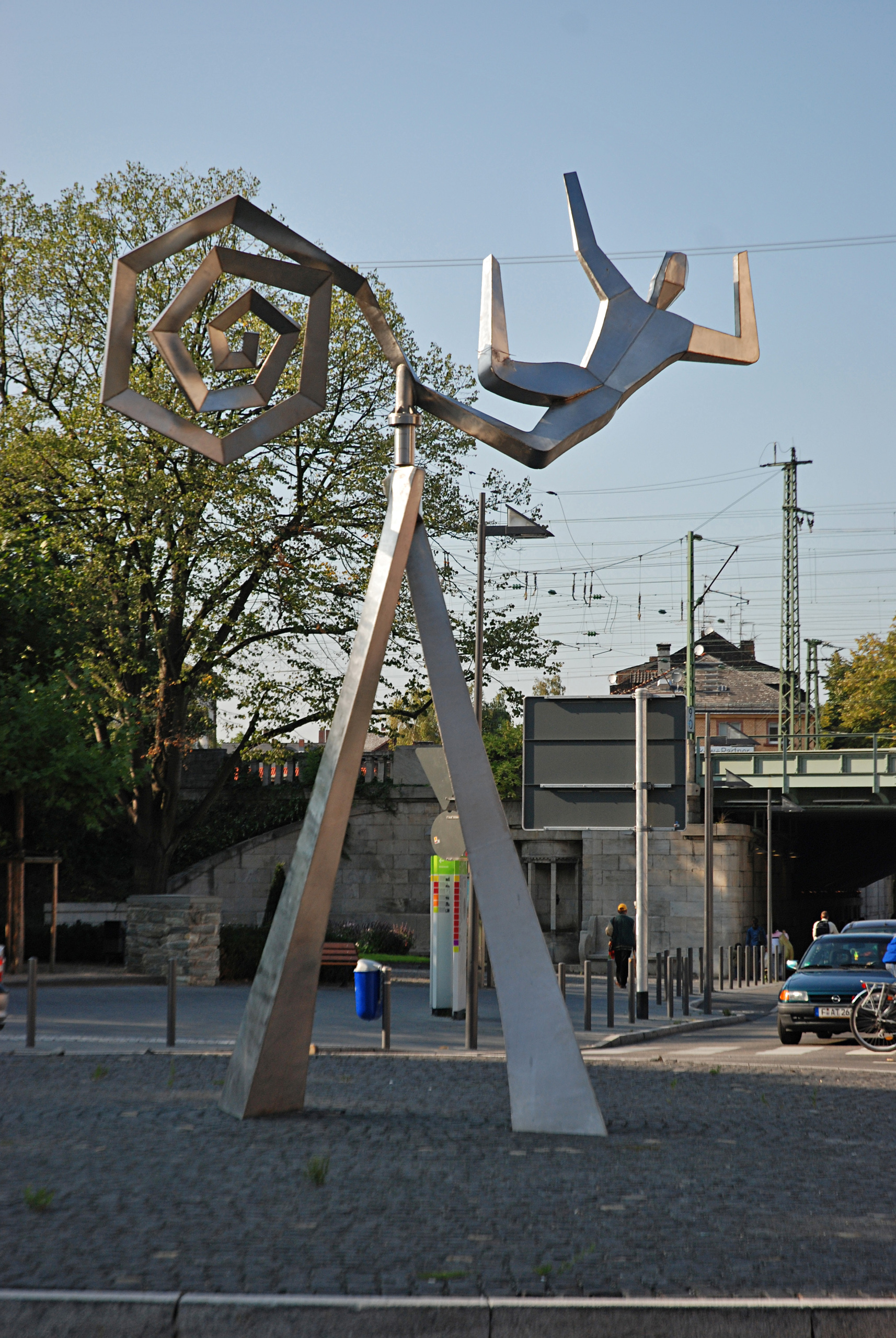
Windsbraut

Eva Renée Nele (born 1932) is a German artist who works principally in goldsmithing and metal sculpture.

== Life ==
Nele was born on 15 March 1932 in Berlin, the daughter of Arnold Bode; she grew up in Kassel. She studied under Hans Uhlmann at the Akademie der Künste in Berlin and under Richard Hamilton at the Central School of Art and Design in London. She also studied at the Atelier Lacourière-Frélaut in Paris. She was a member of Situationist International until 1962. She lives in Frankfurt am Main.

From 1985 to 1990 she taught sculpture at the Internationale Sommerakademie für Bildende Kunst Salzburg in Salzburg, Austria. She also taught at the Goethe-Universität of Frankfurt and – from 1993 – at the University of Giessen in Giessen, in Hesse.

== Work ==
Nele participated in Documenta II, organised by her father in 1959.

Her sculpture The Couple, made in 1961, is in the collection of the Bayerische Staatsgemäldesammlungen in Munich.

Die Rampe, a Holocaust memorial showing faceless cloaked figures descending on a ramp from a railway goods wagon or collapsed at the foot of it, was created in 1982, and was installed on the campus of the University of Kassel in 1985. It was destroyed by arson soon after, and restored in 1987. In 2017 it was moved to the Holländischer Platz campus of the university, much of which is built on land that was formerly the site of factories of the Henschel company, which during the Second World War made extensive use of forced labour. A work titled Windsbraut is in the Dalbergplatz in Frankfurt-Höchst.

In 2008 she was, with the cellist Frank Wolff, one of two recipients in that year of the Goethe Plaque of the City of Frankfurt.
