= Jeppesen Victor Martin =

Danish artist (1930–1993)

Jeppesen Victor Martin (1930 – 1993) was a Danish artist active in the Situationist International.

Martin described his approach to art as "New Irrealism", which was a form of abstract expressionism which was both colourful and somewhat chaotic. He used a variety of mediums including oil, acrylic, enamel, gouache, pencil, collage and lithography, as well as mixed mediums.

In 1967 he organised the Operation Playtime exhibition in Aarhus, which consisted of a series of "anti-paintings" in which the situationist represented by an armada of toy ships painted gold came to conquer the world with play and revolutionary theory. This gave rise to the situationist inspired Golden Fleet group of Swedish radical artists.
