= Ioannis Papadiamantopoulos (1766–1826) =

Greek merchant

Ioannis Papadiamantopoulos Ιωάννης Παπαδιαμαντόπουλος
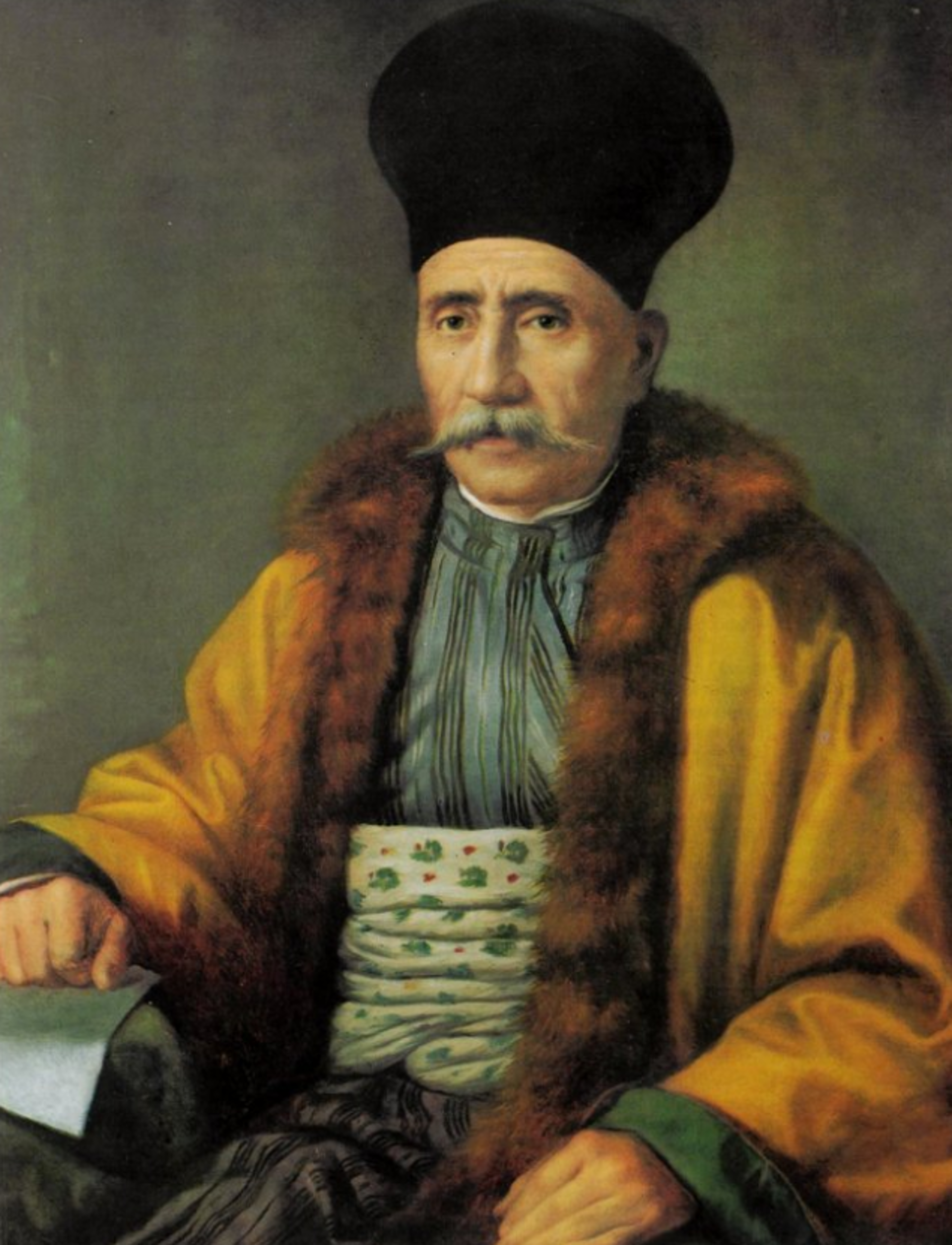
- A painting of Ioannis Papadiamantopoulos by unknown artist, 19th century
- Born: 1766; Corinth, Ottoman Empire
- Died: 1826 (aged 59–60); Messologi, Ottoman Empire
- Occupation: Greek revolutionary leader

Ioannis Papadiamantopoulos (Greek: Ιωάννης Παπαδιαμαντόπουλος; 1766–1826) was a Greek merchant, kodjabashi and revolutionary leader during the Greek War of Independence (1821–1830).

== Biography ==
=== Early life ===
Papadiamantopoulos was born in Corinth in 1766. He lost both parents at a young age and moved to Patras. He married Eleni Kalamogdarti in 1800. Papadiamantopoulos was an upper-class resident of Patras before the Greek revolution broke out in 1821. He had an estate located in the area of Agios Dimitrios in Patras.

=== Military career ===
Papadiamantopoulos sold his entire estate during the revolution started and ran a weapons trade from Italy. Later, he headed to Italy with a ship containing weaponry and hunting from English ships on the Gulf of Patras and brought with him a small ship from Messolongi, which later traded with Patras. In March 1822, he was a fortress chief of the battlefield in Patras and participated in the surrender of the castle of Nafplio by the Ottomans.

Papadiamantopoulos participated also in the naval battles of Hydra and Spetses and also of Elis. He was made president of the tri-member with commission power fallow Greece.

He experienced polemic when having a council in the Third Siege of Missolonghi from March 1825. Otherwise, he headed to Zakynthos and bought and carried weaponry for the soldiers. During that time, his family moved to Zakynthos. His friends counseled him not to return to Messolongi but Papadiamanatopoulos refused. He battled at Messologni and was killed there during the sortie. After the revolution, his family returned to Patras.

=== Legacy ===
A memorial square for Papadiamantopoulos is located next to his house in Patras.

== Family ==
Papadiamantopoulos was married to Eleni Kalamogdartis, daughter of the Kalamogdartis family from Patras, with whom he had six children: Anastasios, Panagiotis, Spyridon, Dimitrios, Konstantinos and Adamantios.

His grandson was the writer Jean Moréas.

== Sources ==
- Spyridon Trikoupis, History of the Greek Revolution (Ιστορία της Ελληνικής επανάστασης, Nea Synora-Livanis Publishers, Athens 1993, SET ISBN 960-236-370-3
- Christos Moulias, To limani tis stafidas (Το λιμάνι της σταφίδας), Peri Technon, Patras 2000, ISBN 960-86814-0-5
