= Jean Moréas =

Greek poet, essayist, and art critic (1856–1910)

- Ioannis A. Papadiamantopoulos
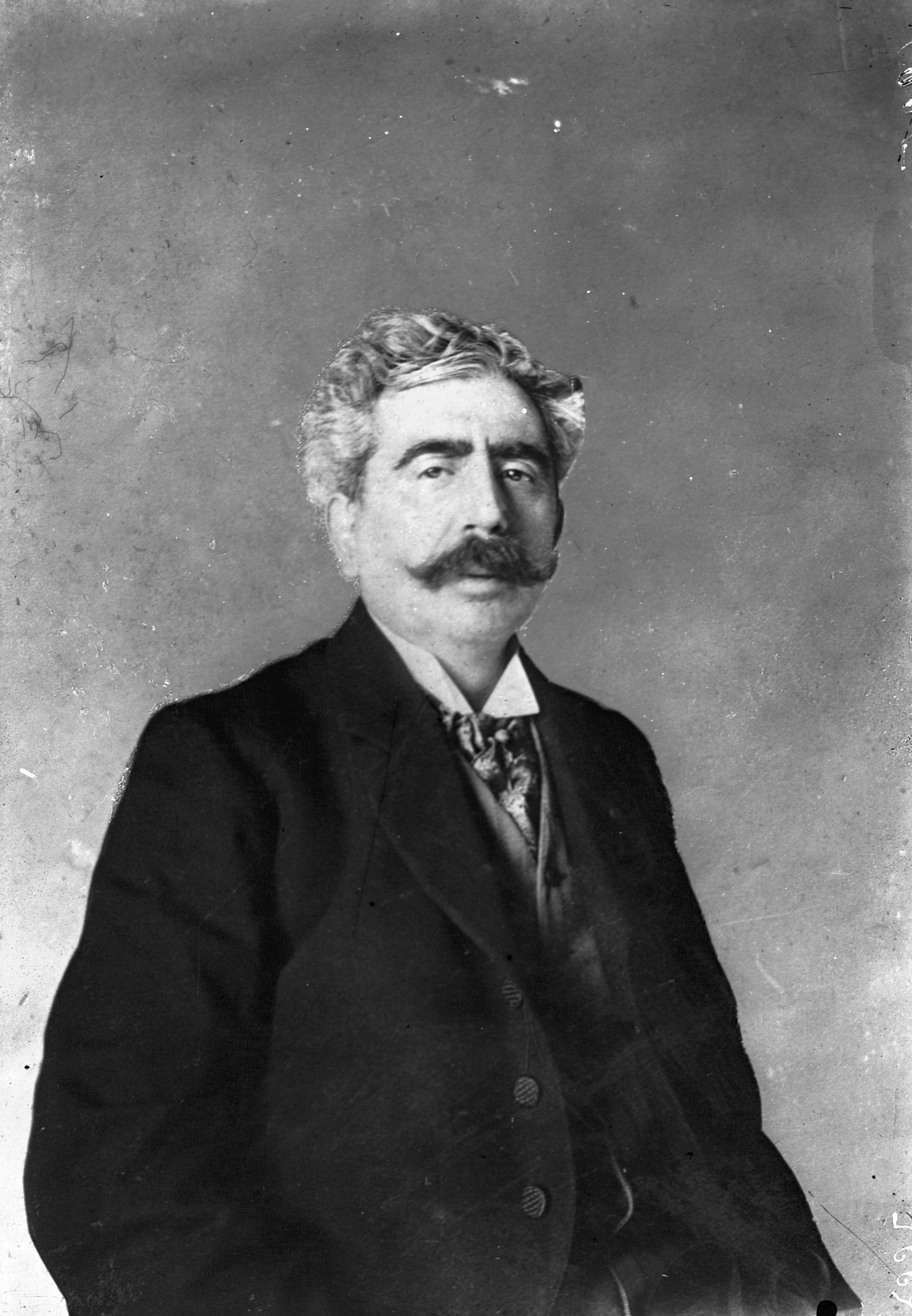
- Born: April 15, 1856; Athens, Greece
- Died: March 31, 1910 (aged 53); Paris, France
- Education: University of Paris
- Occupations: Poet, essayist, art critic
- Relatives: Ioannis Papadiamantopoulos (grandfather), Ioannis Papadiamantopoulos (great uncle)
- Writing career
- Language: French

Signature
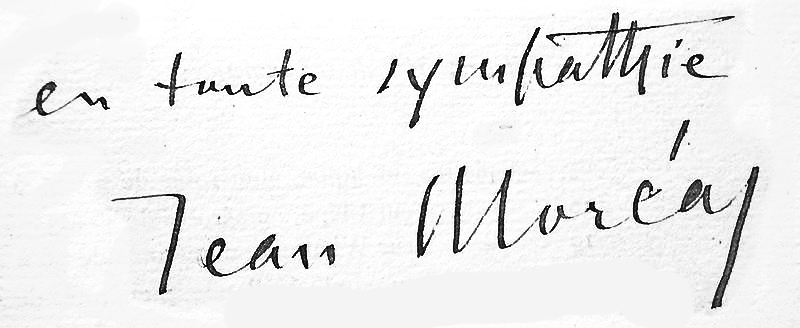

Jean Moréas (French: [ʒɑ̃ mɔʁeɑs, -as]; born Ioannis A. Papadiamantopoulos, Ιωάννης Α. Παπαδιαμαντόπουλος; 15 April 1856 – 31 March 1910) was a Greek poet, essayist, and art critic, who wrote mostly in the French language but also in Greek during his youth.

== Biography ==
Moréas was born into a distinguished Athenian family on April 15, 1856. His ancestors included two well-known men of the Greek War of Independence, namely his paternal grandfather and namesake Ioannis Papadiamantopoulos, born in Corinth but of ultimately Epirote ancestry (he was executed after the fall of Missolonghi), and his maternal great uncle Iakovos Tombazis (c. 1782–1829), from Hydra, who became one of the first admirals of the Greek navy. Moreas's father was Adamantios Papadiamantopoulos from Patras; a judge, scholar, and poet.

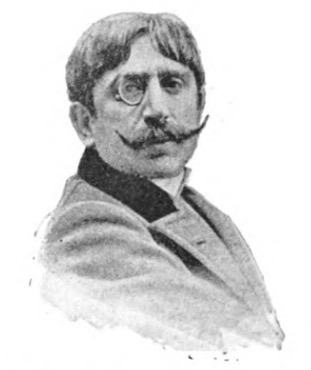
Moréas in April 1895 edition of The Bookman (New York City)

Moreas received a French education, and went to Paris in 1875 to study law at the University of Paris. While in France, he began associating with literary circles, and became acquainted with Les Hydropathes, a group of French writers that included Alphonse Allais, Charles Cros, Guy de Maupassant, and Léon Bloy. He was also an acquaintance of the Greek artist Demetrios Galanis and the Romanian poet Ion Minulescu.

Moréas died in Paris, France, on March 31, 1910.

== Works ==
Moréas published poetry in his publications Lutèce and Le Chat noir, and collected his poems into two editions, Les Syrtes ("The Sandbanks") and Cantilènes, which were strongly influenced by Paul Verlaine.

He was initially a practitioner of the style of Symbolism, and wrote the Symbolist Manifesto (1886), which he published in the newspaper Le Figaro, partly to redeem the reputation of the new generation of young writers from the charge of "decadence" that the press had implied. He was considered one of the most important Symbolist poets until the early 1890s.

In 1891, as Symbolism became more openly associated with anarchism and as the French culture of the Belle Époque became increasingly dominated by revanchism and anti-German sentiment, Moréas published Le Pèlerin passionné which rejected Northern European and Germanic influences, such as Romanticism (as well as some aspects of Symbolism), in favor of solely Classical, Ancient Roman and Ancient Greek, influences. This work helped initiate the École Romane, the aesthetic of which provided Charles Maurras with the ideology necessary for the far-right philosophy Action Française.

Moréas also wrote Les Demoiselles Goubert, a novel, in association with Paul Adam. His most important publications were:

- Les Syrtes (1884)
- Les Cantilènes (1886)
- Le Pèlerin passionné (1891)
- Stances (1893)
- Contes de la vielle France (1904)
