= Jacqueline de Jong =

Dutch painter, sculptor and graphic artist (1939–2024)

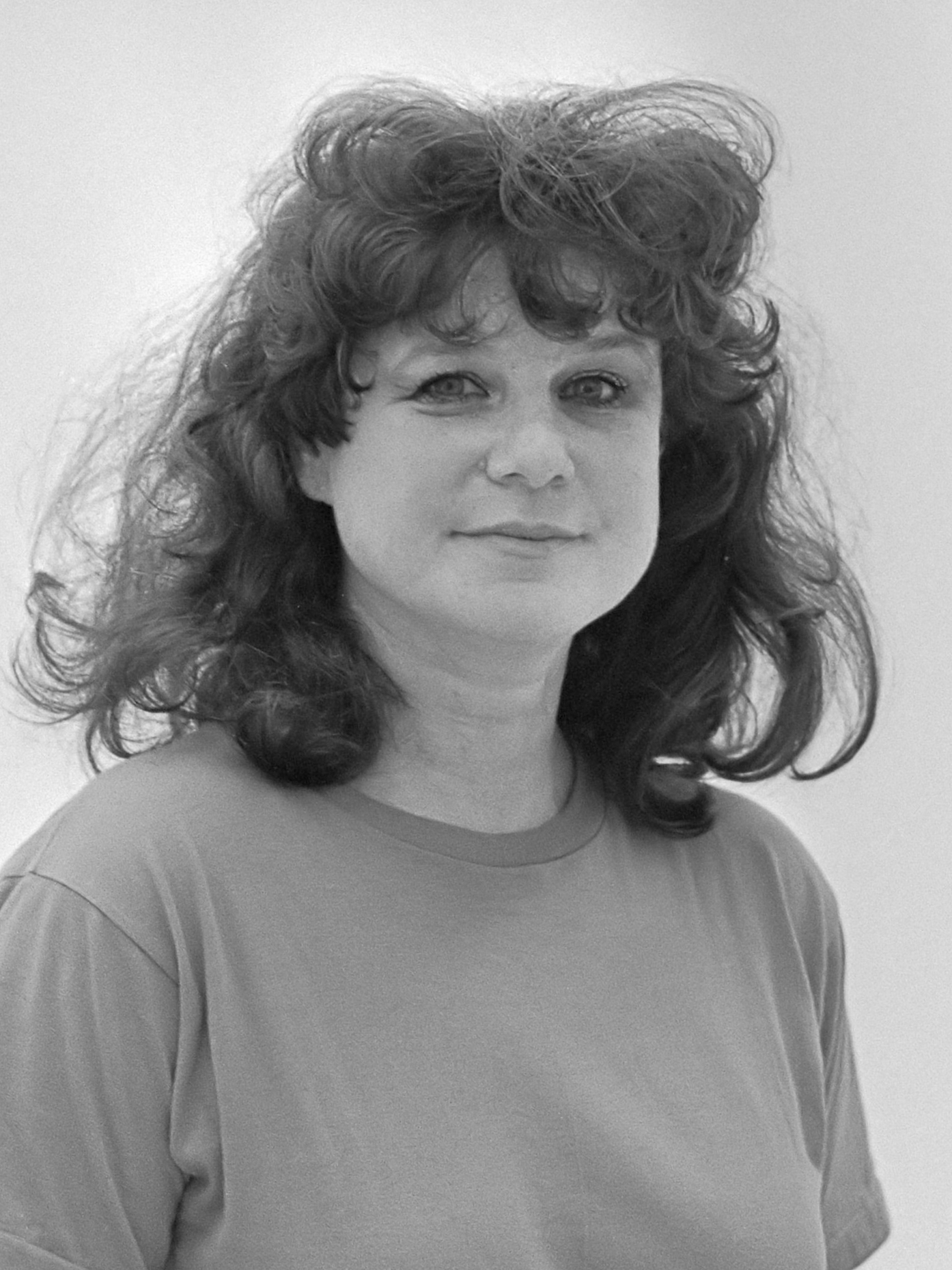
De Jong in 1982

Jacqueline Beatrice de Jong (3 February 1939 – 29 June 2024) was a Dutch painter, sculptor, and graphic artist.

== Biography ==
=== Early life and escape (1939–1957) ===
De Jong was born in the Dutch town of Enschede, where her father, Hans, owned a lace and stocking factory. She grew up in Hengelo, in a Jewish family background. Faced with the German invasion of the Netherlands, they went into hiding. After an abortive escape attempt to England, her father Hans remained in Amsterdam while her mother, Alice de Jong-Weil and she made for Switzerland, accompanied by the Dutch painter Max van Dam. At the border they were captured by the French police, but just as they were about to be deported to the Drancy internment camp, they were rescued by the resistance, who helped them over the border. When they returned to the Netherlands following the war, Jacqueline could not speak Dutch. From 1947 on she went to school in Hengelo and Enschede (at the Gemeentelijk Lyceum).

=== Early career (1957–1990) ===
In 1957 de Jong went to Paris and was employed in the boutique at Christian Dior in the meantime studying French and drama. After leaving for London in the spring of 1958 studying drama at the Guildhall School of Music and Drama, she returned to Amsterdam in September 1958 – 1961 and was employed by the Stedelijk Museum, the home of Modern Art there. She visited London in 1959 where she met Danish painter Asger Jorn, the founder of the CoBrA group, They became companions. He was forty-five years old, compared to her twenty years.

She joined the Situationist International in 1960, and started to participate in conferences and the Central committee. After the expulsion of Constant Nieuwenhuys and his group, she became the Dutch Section of the organization. She did not accept the way the German section, also known as Gruppe SPUR, had been expelled and resigned. The cleft between the Debordists and the Second Situationist International grew, however she refused to join either faction, instead stating that people should act as situationists. Between 1962 and 1968 she edited and published The Situationist Times involving Gaston Bachelard, Roberto Matta, Wifredo Lam and Jacques Prévert in this project. In 1968 she was in Paris, printing and distributing revolutionary posters.

From starting her activities as a painter, sculptor and graphic artist, she keeps on exhibiting all over Europe and the United States. She created wall paintings for the Amsterdam town hall and a separate installation for the Nederlandse Bank.

In 1970 she left Asger Jorn and moved to Amsterdam with Hans Brinkman later on a gallery owner and organiser of exhibitions and international Fairs. They divorced in 1989.

=== Later career and legacy (1990 until death) ===
In 1990 de Jong became the companion of lawyer Thomas H. Weyland (Tom 1931–2009). From 1995 Tom Weyland was on the editorial board of the International Journal of Cultural Property (De Gruyter Berlin- New York). They got married in 1998 in Airopolie (Greece). They gave several lectures on 'intellectual right, copyright, détournement and modification' in the Netherlands and U.K. In 1996 they bought their property in Bourbonnais, France, where she had her vegetable garden and grew potatoes, which became Art ("Potato language," Van Abbe Museum Eindhoven, invited by Jennifer Tee, 2003; "Baked Potatoes," Albisola, Italy, invited by Roberto Ohrt, 2006; and the Golden and Platina jewellery, "Pommes de Jong" 2008–2011). Together with Tom she established The Weyland de Jong Foundation early 2009. The main aim is to support avant-garde artists of all disciplines, architects and art-scientists having reached the age of 50 and over. Weyland died in May 2009.

In 2003, a retrospective exhibition of her work was shown at the Cobra Museum for Contemporary Art in Amstelveen, the Netherlands and at the KunstCentret Silkeborg Bad Denmark, whereas a monography was published, Undercover in de Kunst/in Art (Edition Ludion), in Belgium.

In 2012, an exhibition of her work took place in Stockholm (Moderna Museet, 25 February – 8 April 2012). Her Archive was purchased by Beinecke Rare Book & Manuscript Library, Yale University, USA ('The de Jong Papers') in 2011, where she also gave a lecture (7 May, May 2012).

In 2012 (9–25 May), an exhibition of her work was organized at Boo-Hooray in New York, under the title "Jacqueline de Jong: The Situationist Times 1962-1967”, including publications, photography, ephemera and manuscripts related to de Jong’s publication The Situationist Times, celebrating the 50th anniversary of its first issue, after which five other issues appeared in the following years (till 1967).

In 2019 she received the French AWARE prize for her career and oeuvre, while a retrospective exhibition of her work, Pinball Wizard, was on show at the Stedelijk Museum in Amsterdam.

De Jong died of liver cancer in Amsterdam, on 29 June 2024, at the age of 85.

== Literature ==
- De Jong, Jacqueline (2003). Undercover In the Arts. Ludion.
- Wark, McKenzie (2008). 50 Years of Recuperation of the Situationist International. Princeton Architectural Press.
- Schelvis, Jules (1986). "Sobibor". In Scholtz, Wim (ed.). Max van Dam Joods Kunstenaar 1910 – 1943. Vereniging het Museum.
