= Albert Mockel =

Belgian poet (1866–1945)

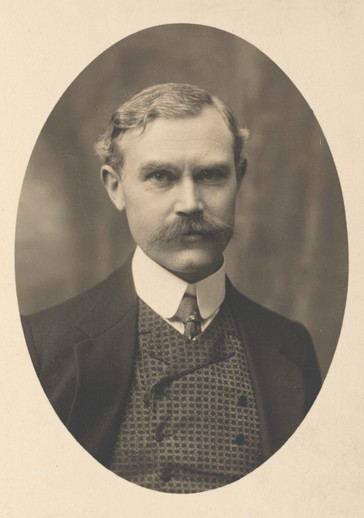
- Mockel, c. 1900
- Born: 27 December 1866; Ougrée, Belgium
- Died: 30 January 1945 (aged 78); Ixelles, Belgium
- Occupation: Poet

Albert Mockel (27 December 1866 – 30 January 1945) was a Belgian Symbolist poet. Born in Ougrée, he was the editor of La Wallonie, an influential journal of Belgian, and even European, Symbolism. He died in January 1945 in Ixelles.

== Publications ==
- Chantefable un peu naïve (1891)
- Stéphane Mallarmé, un héros (1898)
- Propos de littérature (1894)
- Émile Verhaeren (1895)
- Clartés (1901)
- Contes pour les enfants d'hier (1908)
- La Flamme stérile (1923)
- La Flamme immortelle (1924)
