= Eugénio de Castro =

Portuguese poet

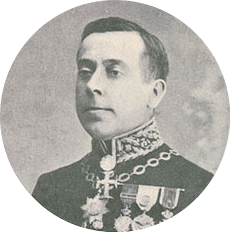
Eugénio de Castro (circa 1913)

Eugénio de Castro e Almeida (March 4, 1869 in Coimbra, Portugal – August 17, 1944) was a Portuguese writer and a poet. He was a professor at the Faculty of Letters at the University of Coimbra and attended Escola Normal Superior in the same university.

His contribution in poetry was divided in two sections: the first symbolic and the second where the author used new rhymes, metric (Alexandrine verses) and richer vocabulary. The author also written about Ancient classics.
