= La Wallonie =

La Wallonie was a cultural review, founded by Albert Mockel, that was published in Liège by H. Vaillant-Carmanne from June 1886 to December 1892. It was significant in propagating Symbolism in French-speaking literary circles both in Belgium and more widely.
