= Decadent movement =

Late 19th-century movement

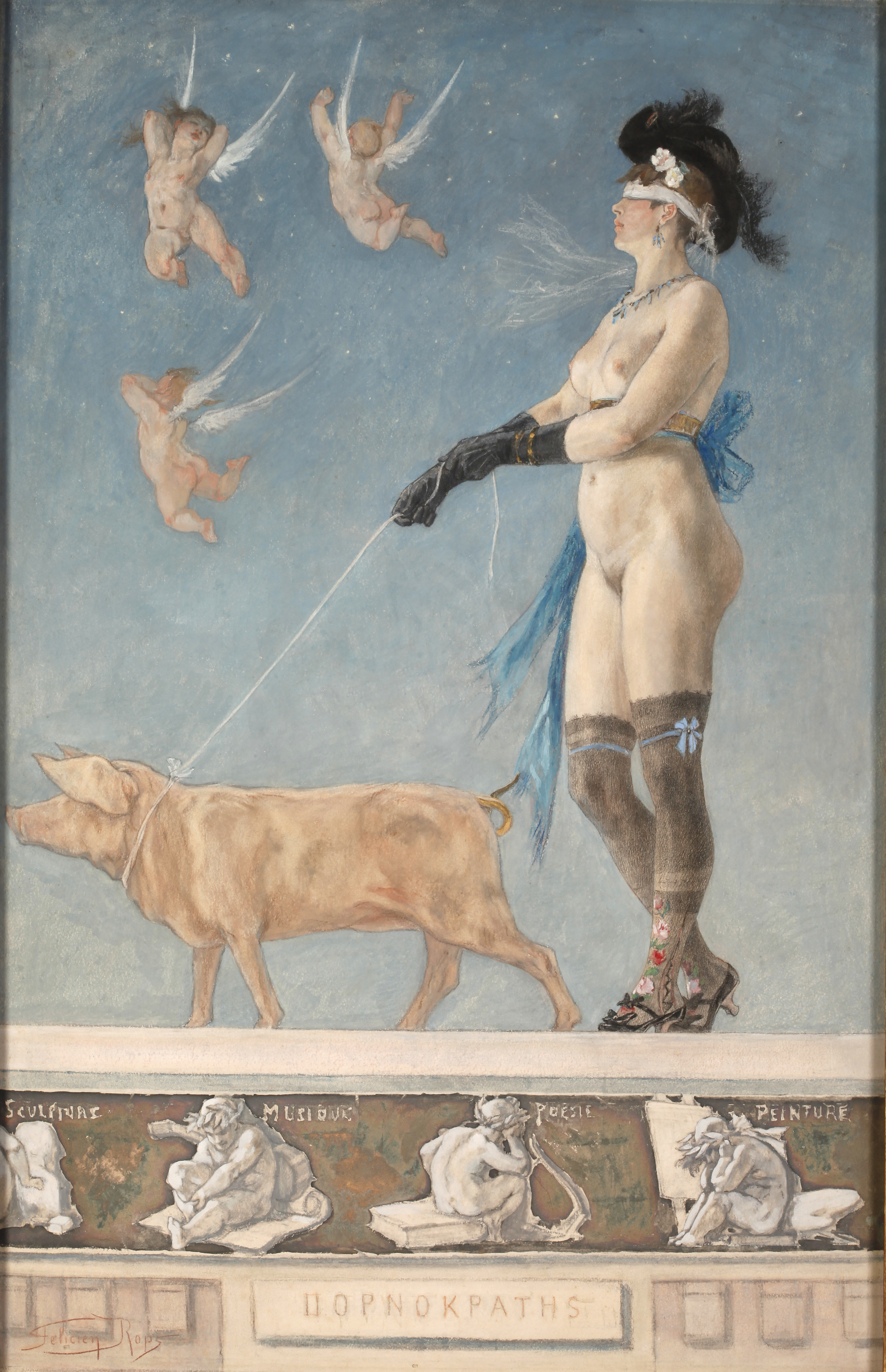
The 1878 Pornokratès by Belgian artist Félicien Rops

The Decadent movement (from the French décadence, lit. 'decay') was a late 19th-century artistic and literary movement, centered in Western Europe, that followed an aesthetic ideology of excess and artificiality.

The Decadent movement first flourished in France and then spread throughout Europe and to the United States. The movement was characterized by a belief in the superiority of human fantasy and aesthetic hedonism over logic and the natural world.

== Overview ==
The concept of decadence dates to the 18th century, especially from the writings of Montesquieu, the Enlightenment philosopher who suggested that the decline (décadence) of the Roman Empire was in large part due to its moral decay and loss of cultural standards. When Latin scholar Désiré Nisard turned toward French literature, he compared Victor Hugo and Romanticism in general to the Roman decadence, men sacrificing their craft and their cultural values for the sake of pleasure. The trends that he identified, such as an interest in description, a lack of adherence to the conventional rules of literature and art, and a love for extravagant language, were the seeds of the Decadent movement.

=== French Decadent movement ===
The first major development in French decadence appeared when writers Théophile Gautier and Charles Baudelaire used the word proudly to represent a rejection of what they considered banal "progress". Baudelaire referred to himself as decadent in his 1857 edition of Les Fleurs du mal and exalted the Roman decline as a model for modern poets to express their passion. He later used the term decadence to include the subversion of traditional categories in pursuit of full, sensual expression. In his lengthy introduction to Baudelaire in the front of the 1868 Les Fleurs du mal, Gautier at first rejects the application of the term decadent, as meant by the critic, but then works his way to an admission of decadence on Baudelaire's own terms: a preference for what is beautiful and what is exotic, an ease with surrendering to fantasy, and a maturity of skill with manipulating language.

The Belgian Félicien Rops was instrumental in the development of this early stage of the Decadent movement. A friend of Baudelaire, he was a frequent illustrator of Baudelaire's writing, at the request of the author himself. Rops delighted in breaking artistic convention and shocking the public with gruesome, fantastical horror. He was explicitly interested in the Satanic, and he frequently sought to portray the double-threat of Satan and Woman. At times, his only goal was the portrayal of a woman he'd observed debasing herself in the pursuit of her own pleasure. It has been suggested that, no matter how horrific and perverse his images could be, Rops' invocation of supernatural elements was sufficient to keep Baudelaire situated in a spiritually aware universe that maintained a cynical kind of hope, even if the poetry "requires a strong stomach". Their work was the worship of beauty disguised as the worship of evil. For both of them, mortality and all manner of corruptions were always on their mind. The ability of Rops to see and portray the same world as they did made him a popular illustrator for other Decadent authors.

The concept of decadence lingered after that, but it was not until 1884 that Maurice Barrès referred to a particular group of writers as Decadents. He defined this group as those who had been influenced heavily by Baudelaire, though they were also influenced by Gothic novels and the poetry and fiction of Edgar Allan Poe. Many were associated with Symbolism, others with Aestheticism. The pursuit of these authors, according to Arthur Symons, was "a desperate endeavor to give sensation, to flash the impression of the moment, to preserve the very heat and motion of life", and their achievement, as he saw it, was "to be a disembodied voice, and yet the voice of a human soul".

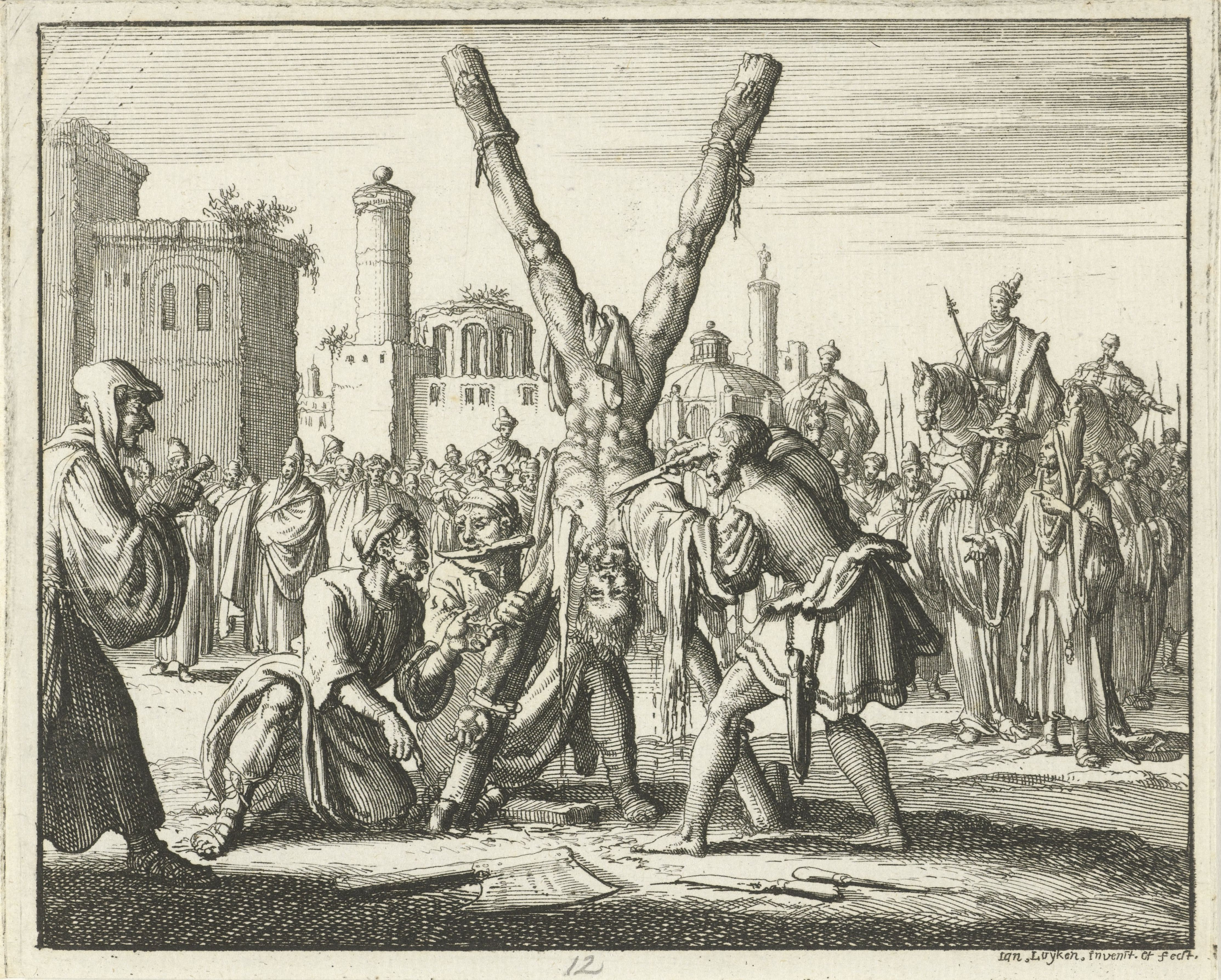
Apostle Bartolomew flayed alive, by Jan Luyken, 1685

In his 1884 Decadent novel À rebours (English: Against Nature or Against the Grain), Joris-Karl Huysmans identified likely candidates for the core of the Decadent movement, which he seemed to view Baudelaire as sitting above Paul Verlaine, Tristan Corbière, Theodore Hannon and Stéphane Mallarmé. His character Des Esseintes hailed these writers for their creativity and their craftsmanship, suggesting that they filled him with "insidious delight" as they used a "secret language" to explore "twisted and precious ideas".

Not only did À rebours define an ideology and a literature, but it also created an influential perspective on visual art. The character of Des Esseintes explicitly heralded the paintings of Gustave Moreau, the 17th-century Dutch engraver Jan Luyken's illustrations to the Martyrs Mirror and the lithographs of Rodolphe Bresdin and Odilon Redon. The choice of these works established a decadent perspective on art which favored madness and irrationality, graphic violence, frank pessimism about cultural institutions, and a disregard for visual logic of the natural world. It has been suggested that a dream vision that Des Esseintes describes is based on the series of satanic encounters painted by Félicien Rops.

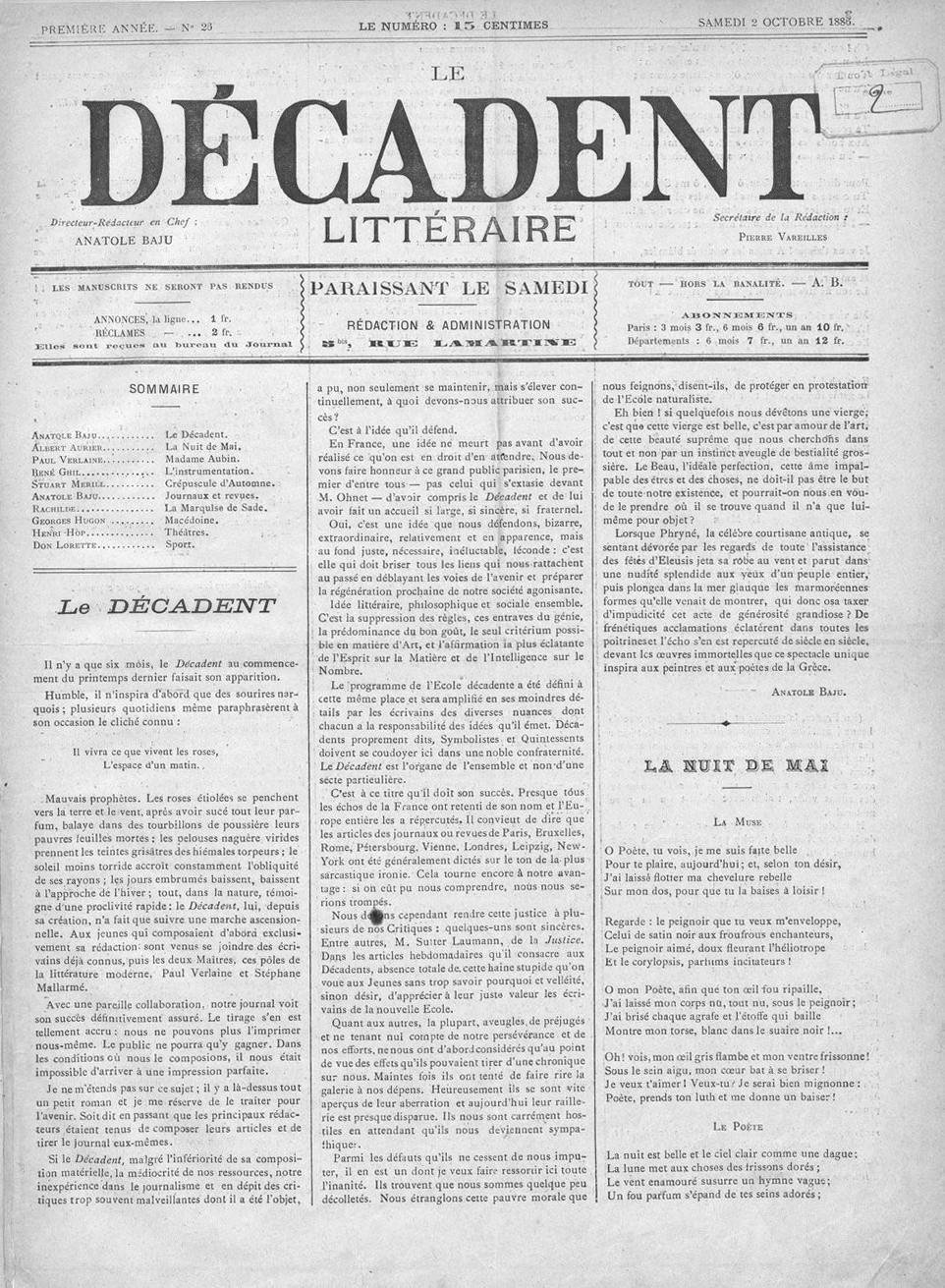
Title page of the magazine Le Décadent

Capitalizing on the momentum of Huysmans' work, Anatole Baju founded the magazine Le Décadent in 1886, an effort to define and organize the Decadent movement in a formal way. This group of writers did not only look to escape the boredom of the banal, but they sought to shock, scandalize, and subvert the expectations and values of society, believing that such freedom and creative experimentation would improve humanity.

Not everyone was comfortable with Baju and Le Décadent, even including some who had been published in its pages. Rival writer Jean Moréas published his Symbolist Manifesto, largely to escape association with the Decadent movement, despite their shared heritage. Moréas and Gustave Kahn, among others, formed rival publications to reinforce the distinction. Paul Verlaine embraced the label at first, applauding it as a brilliant marketing choice by Baju. After seeing his own words exploited and tiring of Le Décadent publishing works falsely attributed to Arthur Rimbaud, however, Verlaine came to sour on Baju personally, and he eventually rejected the label, as well.

Decadence continued on in France, but it was limited largely to Anatole Baju and his followers, who refined their focus even further on perverse sexuality, material extravagance, and up-ending social expectations. Far-fetched plots were acceptable if they helped generate the desired moments of salacious experience or glorification of the morbid and grotesque. Writers who embraced the sort of decadence featured in Le Décadent include Albert Aurier, Rachilde, Pierre Vareilles, Miguel Hernández, Jean Lorrain and Laurent Tailhade. Many of these authors did also publish symbolist works, however, and it is unclear how strongly they would have identified with Baju as Decadents.

In France, the Decadent movement is often said to have begun with either Joris-Karl Huysmans' Against Nature (1884) or Baudelaire's Les Fleurs du mal. This movement essentially gave way to Symbolism when Le Décadent closed down in 1889 and Anatole Baju turned toward politics and became associated with anarchy. A few writers continued the Decadent tradition, such as Octave Mirbeau, but Decadence was no longer a recognized movement, let alone a force in literature or art.

Beginning with the association of decadence with cultural decline, it is not uncommon to associate decadence in general with transitional times and their associated moods of pessimism and uncertainty. In France, the heart of the Decadent movement was during the 1880s and 1890s, the time of fin de siècle, or end-of-the-century gloom. As part of that overall transition, many scholars of Decadence, such as David Weir, regard Decadence as a dynamic transition between Romanticism and Modernism, especially considering the Decadent tendency to dehumanize and distort in the name of pleasure and fantasy.

=== Distinction from Symbolism ===
Symbolism has often been confused with the Decadent movement. Arthur Symons, a British poet and literary critic contemporary with the movement, at one time considered Decadence in literature to be a parent category that included both Symbolism and Impressionism, as rebellions against realism. He defined this common, decadent thread as "an intense self-consciousness, a restless curiosity in research, an over-subtilizing refinement upon refinement, a spiritual and moral perversity". He referred to all such literature as "a new and beautiful and interesting disease". Later, however, he described the Decadent movement as an "interlude, half a mock interlude" that distracted critics from seeing and appreciating the larger and more important trend, which was the development of Symbolism.

It is true that the two groups share an ideological descent from Baudelaire and for a time they both considered themselves as part of one sphere of new, anti-establishment literature. They worked together and met together for quite a while, as if they were part of the same movement. Maurice Barrès referred to this group as decadents, but he also referred to one of them (Stéphane Mallarmé) as a symbolist. Even Jean Moréas used both terms for his own group of writers as late as 1885.

Only a year later, however, Jean Moréas wrote his Symbolist Manifesto to assert a difference between the symbolists with whom he allied himself and this the new group of decadents associated with Anatole Baju and Le Décadent. Even after this, there was sufficient common ground of interest, method, and language to blur the lines more than the manifesto might have suggested.

In the world of visual arts, it can be even more difficult to distinguish Decadence from Symbolism. In fact, Stephen Romer has referred to Félicien Rops, Gustave Moreau, and Fernand Khnopff as "Symbolist–Decadent painters and engravers".

Nevertheless, there are clear ideological differences between those who continued on as symbolists and those who have been called "dissidents" for remaining in the Decadent movement. Often, there was little doubt that Baju and his group were producing work that was decadent, but there is frequently more question about the work of the symbolists.

==== On nature ====
Both groups reject the primacy of nature, but what that means for them is very different. Symbolism uses extensive natural imagery as a means to elevate the viewer to a plane higher than the banal reality of nature itself, as when Stéphane Mallarmé mixes descriptions of flowers and heavenly imagery to create a transcendent moment in "Flowers".

Decadence, in contrast, actually belittles nature in the name of artistry. In Huysmans' Against Nature, for instance, the main character Des Esseintes says of nature: "There is not one of her inventions, no matter how subtle or imposing it may be, which human genius cannot create ... There can be no doubt about it: this eternal, driveling, old woman is no longer admired by true artists, and the moment has come to replace her by artifice."

==== On language and imagery ====
Symbolism treats language and imagery as devices that can only approximate meaning and merely evoke complex emotions and call the mind toward ideas it might not be able to comprehend. In the words of symbolist poet Stéphane Mallarmé:

Languages are imperfect because multiple; the supreme language is missing ... no one can utter words which would bear the miraculous stamp of Truth Herself Incarnate...how impossible it is for language to express things ... in the Poet's hands ... by the consistent virtue and necessity of an art which lives on fiction, it achieves its full efficacy.

Moréas asserted in his manifesto on Symbolism that words and images serve to dress the incomprehensible in such a way that it can be approached, if not understood.

Decadence, on the other hand, sees no path to higher truth in words and images. Instead, books, poetry, and art itself are seen as the creators of valid new worlds, thus the allegory of decadent Wilde's Dorian Gray being poisoned by a book like a drug. Words and artifice are the vehicles for human creativity, and Huysmans suggests that the illusions of fantasy have their own reality: "The secret lies in knowing how to proceed, how to concentrate deeply enough to produce the hallucination and succeed in substituting the dream reality for the reality itself."

==== On reality, illusion, and truth ====
Both groups are disillusioned with the meaning and truth offered by the natural world, rational thought, and ordinary society. Symbolism turns its eyes toward Greater Purpose or on the Ideal, using dreams and symbols to approach these esoteric primal truths. In Mallarmé's poem "Apparition", for instance, the word "dreaming" appears twice, followed by "Dream" itself with a capital D. In "The Windows", he speaks of this decadent disgust of contentment with comfort and an endless desire for the exotic. He writes: "So filled with disgust for the man whose soul is callous, sprawled in comforts where his hungering is fed." In this continuing search for the spiritual, therefore, Symbolism has been predisposed to concern itself with purity and beauty and such mysterious imagery as those of fairies.

In contrast, Decadence states there is no oblique approach to ultimate truth because there is no secret, mystical truth. They despise the very idea of searching for such a thing. If there is truth of value, it is purely in the sensual experience of the moment. The heroes of Decadent novels, for instance, have the unquenchable accumulation of luxuries and pleasure, often exotic, as their goal, even the gory and the shocking. In The Temptation of Saint Anthony, decadent Gustave Flaubert describes Saint Anthony's pleasure from watching disturbing scenes of horror. Later Czech decadent Arthur Breisky has been quoted by scholars as speaking to both the importance of illusion and of beauty: "But isn't it necessary to believe a beautiful mask more than reality?"

==== On art ====
Ultimately, the distinction may best be seen in their approach to art. Symbolism is an accumulation of "symbols" that are there not to present their content but to evoke greater ideas that their symbolism cannot expressly utter. According to Moréas, it is an attempt to connect the objects and phenomena of the world to "esoteric primordial truths" that cannot ever be directly approached.

Decadence, on the other hand, is an accumulation of signs or descriptions acting as detailed catalogs of human material riches as well as artifice. It was Oscar Wilde who perhaps laid this out most clearly in The Decay of Lying with the suggestion of three doctrines on art, here excerpted into a list:

1. "Art never expresses anything but itself."
2. "All bad art comes from returning to Life and Nature, and elevating them into ideals."
3. "Life imitates Art far more than Art imitates Life"

After which, he suggested a conclusion quite in contrast to Moréas' search for shadow truth: "Lying, the telling of beautiful untrue things, is the proper aim of Art."

== Influence and legacy ==
=== Collapse of the Decadent movement ===
In France, the Decadent movement could not withstand the loss of its leading figures. Many of those associated with the Decadent movement became symbolists after initially associating freely with decadents. Paul Verlaine and Stéphane Mallarmé were among those, though both had been associated with Baju's Le Décadent for a time. Others kept a foot in each camp. Albert Aurier wrote decadent pieces for Le Décadent and also wrote symbolist poetry and art criticism. Decadent writer Rachilde was staunchly opposed to a symbolist take over of Le Décadent even though her own one-act drama The Crystal Spider is almost certainly a symbolist work. Others, once strong voices for decadence, abandoned the movement altogether. Joris-Karl Huysmans grew to consider Against Nature as the starting point on his journey into Roman Catholic symbolist work and the acceptance of hope. Anatole Baju, once the self-appointed school-master of French decadence, came to think of the movement as naive and half-hearted, willing to tinker and play with social realities, but not to utterly destroy them. He left decadence for anarchy.

=== The Decadent movement beyond France ===
While the Decadent movement, per se, was mostly a French phenomenon, the impact was felt more broadly. Typically, the influence was felt as an interest in pleasure, an interest in experimental sexuality, and a fascination with the bizarre, all packaged with a somewhat transgressive spirit and an aesthetic that values material excess. Many were also influenced by the Decadent movement's aesthetic emphasis on art for its own sake.

==== Bohemia ====
Czech writers who were exposed to the work of the Decadent movement saw in it the promise of a life they could never know. These Bohemian decadent writers included Karel Hlaváček, Arnošt Procházka, Jiří Karásek ze Lvovic, and Louisa Zikova. One Czech writer, Arthur Breisky, embraced the full spirit of Le Décadent with its exultation in material excess and a life of refinement and pleasure. From the Decadent movement he learned the basic idea of a dandy, and his work is almost entirely focused on developing a philosophy in which the Dandy is the consummate human, surrounded by riches and elegance, theoretically above society, just as doomed to death and despair as they.

==== Britain ====
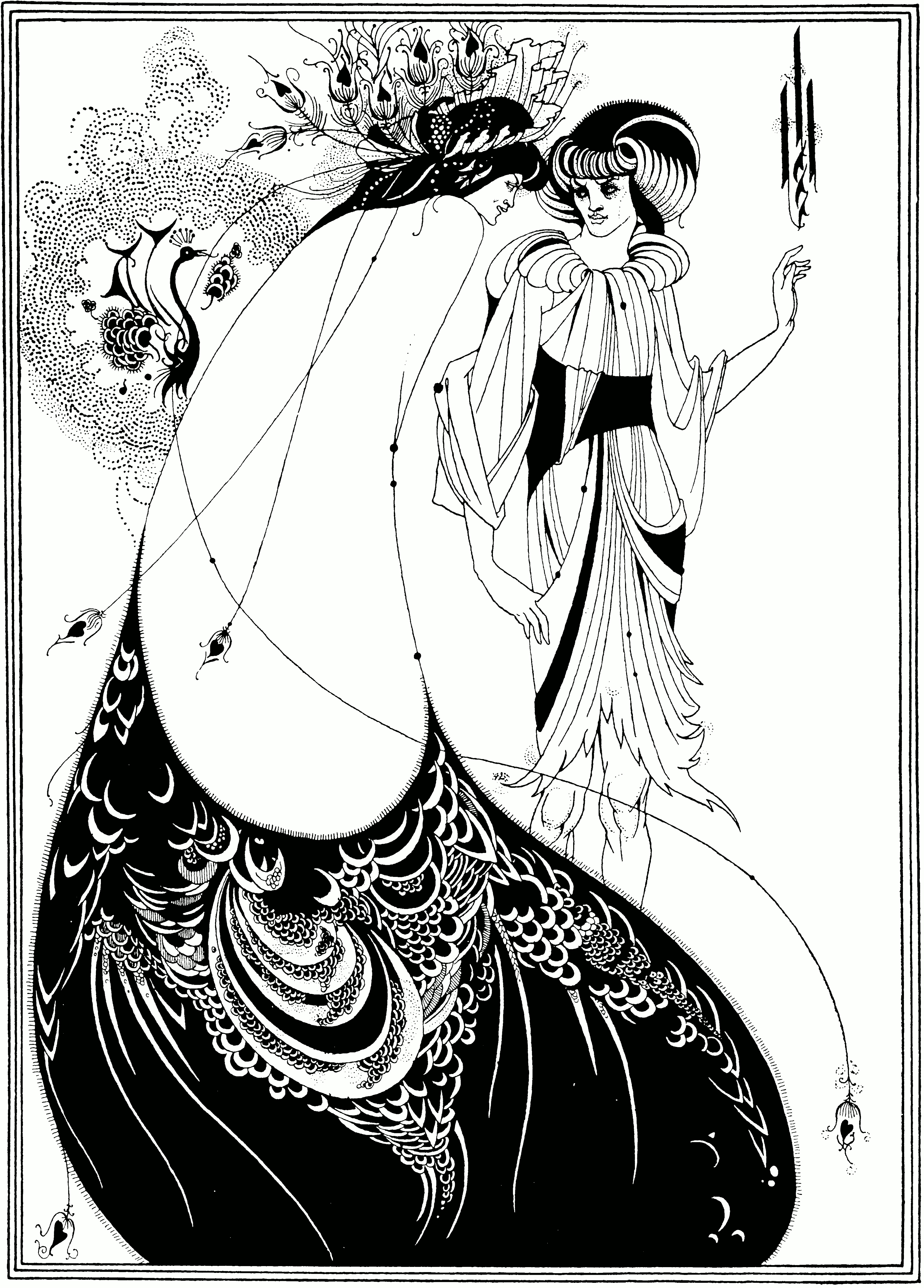
Aubrey Beardsley, The Peacock Skirt, illustration for Oscar Wilde's Salome, 1892

Influenced through general exposure but also direct contact, the leading decadent figures in Britain associated with decadence were Irish writer Oscar Wilde, poet Algernon Charles Swinburne, and illustrator Aubrey Beardsley, as well as other artists and writers associated with The Yellow Book. Others, such as Walter Pater, resisted association with the movement, even though their works seemed to reflect similar ideals. While most of the influence was from figures such as Baudelaire and Verlaine, there was also very strong influence at times from more purely decadent members of the French movement, such as the influence that Huysmans and Rachilde had on Wilde, as seen explicitly in The Picture of Dorian Gray. British decadents embraced the idea of creating art for its own sake, pursuing all possible desires, and seeking material excess. At the same time, they were not shy about using the tools of decadence for social and political purpose. Beardsley had an explicit interest in the improvement of the social order and the role of art-as-experience in inspiring that transformation. Oscar Wilde published an entire work exploring socialism as a liberating force: "Socialism would relieve us from that sordid necessity of living for others which, in the present condition of things, presses so hardly upon almost everybody." Swinburne explicitly addressed Irish–English politics in poetry when he wrote "Thieves and murderers, hands yet red with blood and tongues yet black with lies | Clap and clamour – 'Parnell spurs his Gladstone well!'" In many of their personal lives, they also pursued decadent ideals. Wilde had a secret homosexual life. Swinburne had an obsession with flagellation.

==== Italy ====
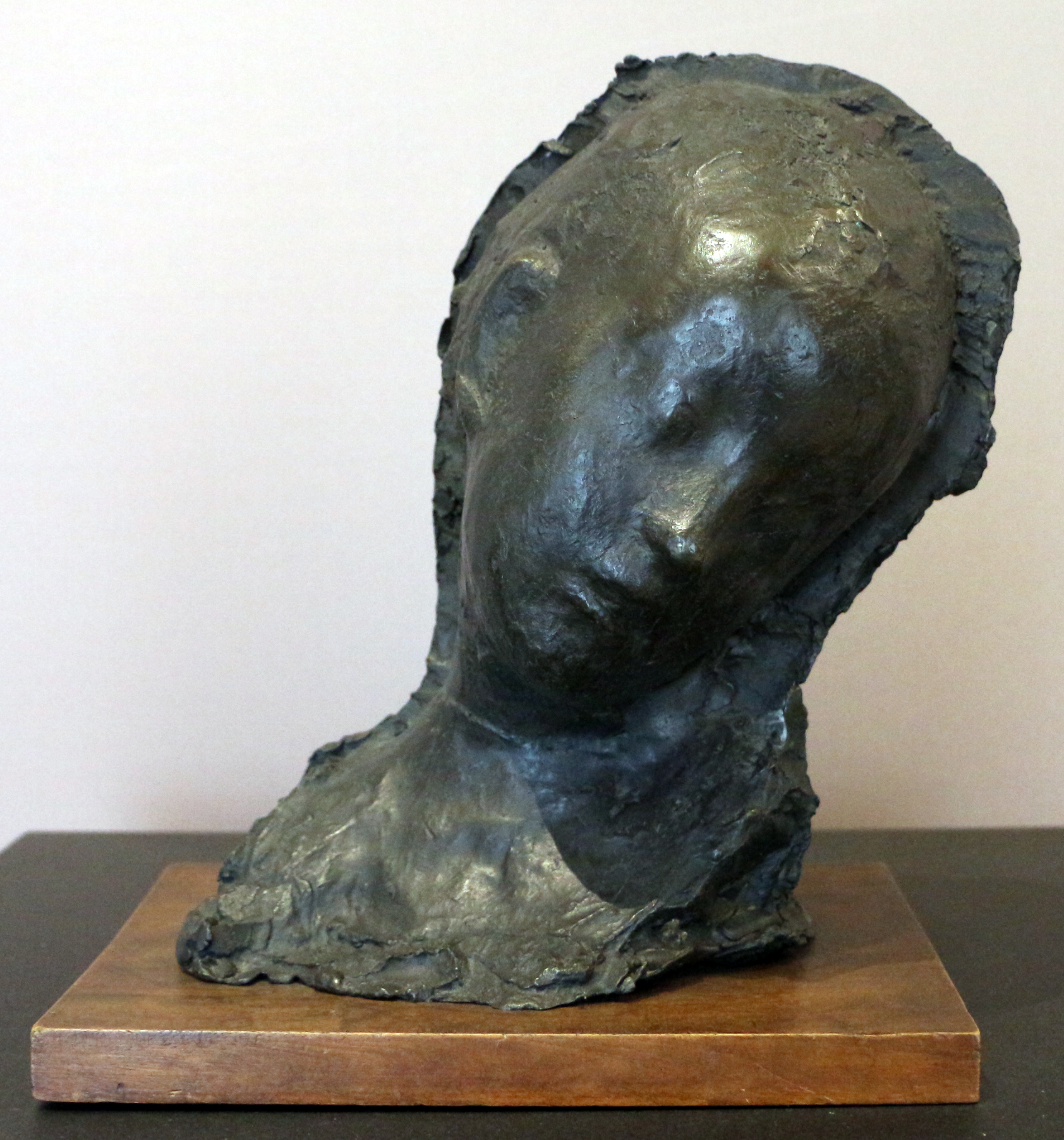
Medardo Rosso, Sick child, 1903–04

Italian literary criticism has often looked at the decadent movement on a larger scale, proposing that its main features could be used to define a full historical period, running from the 1860s to the 1920s. For this reason, the term Decadentism, modeled on "Romanticism" or "Expressionism", became more substantial and widespread than elsewhere. However, most critics today prefer to distinguish between three periods. The first period is marked by the experience of Scapigliatura, a sort of proto-decadent movement. The Scapigliati (literally meaning "unkempt" or "dishevelled") were a group of writers and poets who shared a sentiment of intolerance for the suffocating intellectual atmosphere between the late Risorgimento (1860s) and the early years of unified Italy (1870s). They contributed to rejuvenate Italian culture through foreign influences and introduced decadent themes like illness and fascination with death. The novel Fosca (1869) by Igino Ugo Tarchetti tells of a love triangle involving a codependent man, a married woman and an ugly, sick and vampire-like figure, the femme fatale Fosca. In a similar way, Camillo Boito's Senso and his short stories venture into tales of sexual decadence and disturbing obsessions, such as incest and necrophilia. Other Scapigliati were the novelists Carlo Dossi and Giuseppe Rovani, the poet Emilio Praga, the poet and composer Arrigo Boito and the composer Franco Faccio. As for the visual arts, Medardo Rosso stands out as one of the most influential European sculptors of that time. Most of the Scapigliati died of illness, alcoholism or suicide. The second period of Italian Decadentism is dominated by Gabriele D'Annunzio, Antonio Fogazzaro and Giovanni Pascoli. D'Annunzio, who was in contact with many French intellectuals and had read the works of Nietzsche in the French translation, imported the concepts of Übermensch and will to power into Italy, although in his own particular version. The poet's aim had to be an extreme aestheticization of life, and life the ultimate work of art. Recurrent themes in his literary works include the supremacy of the individual, the cult of beauty, exaggerated sophistication, the glorification of machines, the fusion of man with nature, the exalted vitality coexisting with the triumph of death. His novel The Pleasure, published one year before The Picture of Dorian Gray, is considered one of the three genre-defining books of the Decadent movement, along with Wilde's novel and Huysmans's Against Nature. Less flashy and more isolated than D'Annunzio, and close to the French symbolists, Pascoli redefined poetry as a means of clairvoyance to regain the purity of things. Finally, the third period, which can be seen as a postlude to Decadentism, is marked by the voices of Italo Svevo, Luigi Pirandello and the Crepusculars. Svevo, with his novel Zeno's Conscience, took the idea of sickness to its logical conclusion, while Pirandello proceeded to the extreme disintegration of the self with works such as The Late Mattia Pascal, Six Characters in Search of an Author and One, No One, and One Hundred Thousand. On the other side, the Crepuscular poets (literally "twilight poets") turned Pascoli's innovations into a mood-conveying poetry, which describes the melancholy of everyday life in shady and monotonous interiors of provincial towns. These atmospheres were explored by the painters Mario Sironi, Giorgio de Chirico and Giorgio Morandi. Guido Gozzano was the most brilliant and ironic of the Crepusculars, but we can also remember Sergio Corazzini, Marino Moretti and Aldo Palazzeschi.

==== Russia ====
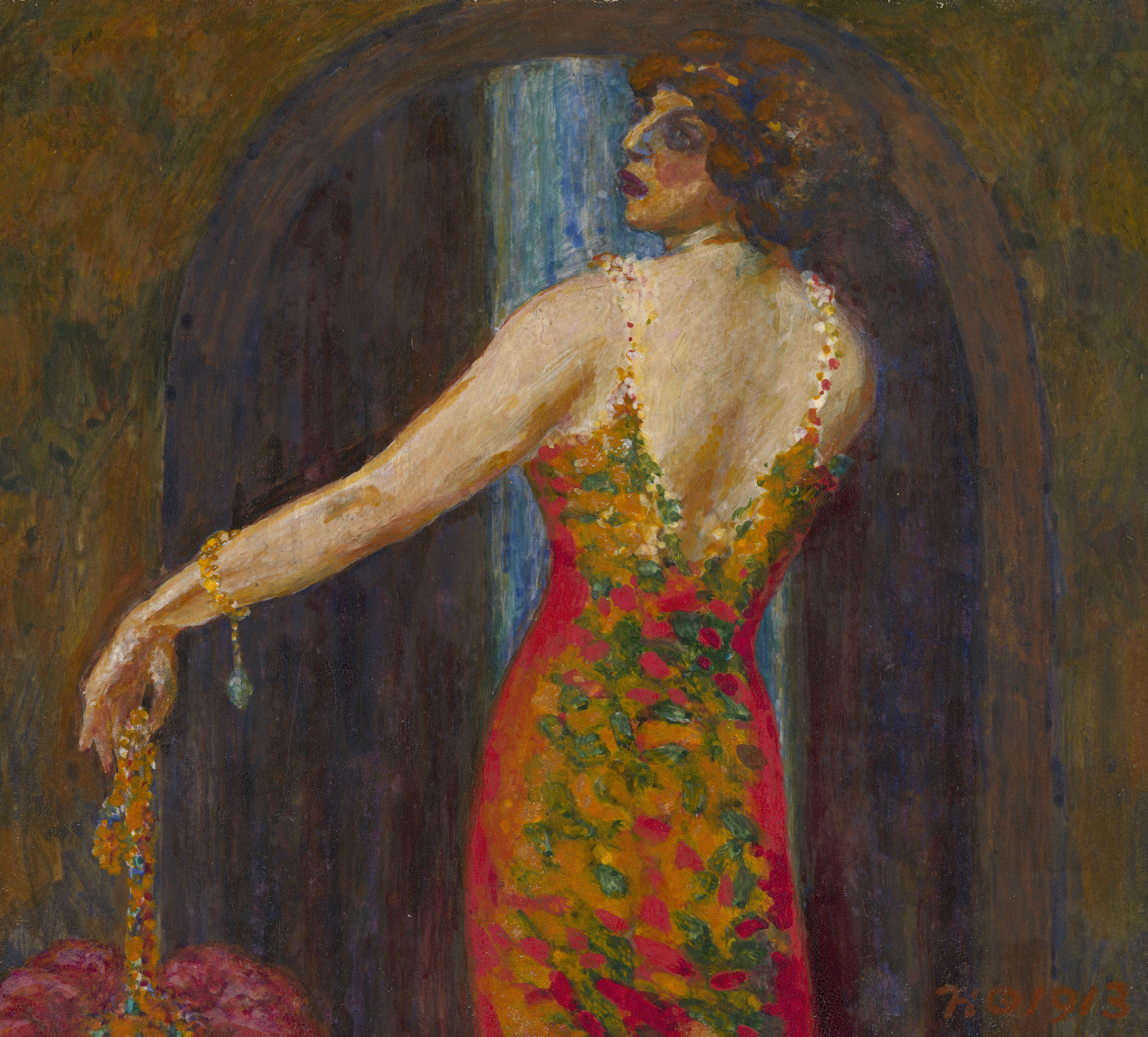
Portrait of Euphemia Pavlova Nosova by Nikolai Kalmakov

The Decadent movement reached into Russia primarily through exposure to the writings of Charles Baudelaire and Paul Verlaine. The earliest Russian adherents lacked idealism and focused on such decadent themes as subversion of morality, disregard for personal health, and living in blasphemy and sensual pleasure. Russian writers were especially drawn to the morbid aspects of decadence and in the fascination with death. Dmitry Merezhkovsky is thought to be the first to clearly promote a Russian decadence that included the idealism that eventually inspired the French symbolists to disassociate from the more purely materialistic Decadent movement. The first Russian writers to achieve success as followers of this Decadent movement included Konstanin Balmont, Fyodor Sologub, Valery Bryusov, and Zinaida Gippius. As they refined their craft beyond imitation of Baudelaire and Verlaine, most of these authors became much more clearly aligned with Symbolism than with Decadence. Some visual artists adhered to the Baju-esque late Decadent movement approach to sexuality as purely an act of pleasure, often ensconced in a context of material luxury. They also shared the same emphasis on shocking society, purely for the scandal. Among them were Konstantin Somov, Nikolai Kalmakov, and Nikolay Feofilaktov.

==== Spain ====
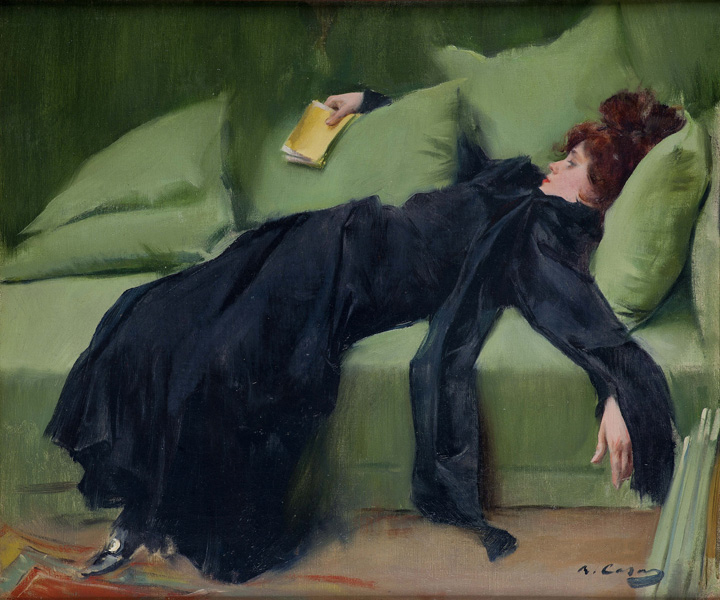
A Decadent Girl, by Ramón Casas, 1899

Some art historians consider Francisco de Goya one of the roots of the Decadent movement in Spain, almost 100 years before its start in France. His works were a cry of denouncement against injustice and oppression. However, Ramon Casas and José María López Mezquita can be considered the model artists of this period. Their paintings are an image of the social conflicts and police repression that was happening in Spain at the time.

Spanish writers also wanted to be part of this movement, such as Emilia Pardo Bazán, with works like Los pazos de Ulloa, where terror and Decadent topics appear. El monstruo ("The Monster"), written by Antonio de Hoyos y Vinent, belongs to the Decadent movement. But the Decadent movement is overlapped by the Fin de Siglo Movement, with the authors of the Generación del 98 being part-Decadent: Ramón María del Valle-Inclán, Unamuno and Pío Baroja are the most essential figures of this period.

==== United States ====
Few prominent writers or artists in the United States were connected with the Decadent movement. Those who were connected struggled to find an audience, for Americans were reluctant to see value for them in what they considered the art forms of fin de siècle France. An exception to this is the decadent poet George Sylvester Viereck, who wrote (1907) "Nineveh and Other Poems". Viereck states in his "The Candle and the Flame" (1912):

I have no reason to be ungrateful to America. Few poets have met with more instant recognition... My work almost from the beginning was discussed simultaneously in the most conservative periodicals and the most ultra-saffron complexioned journals I have given a new lyric impetus to my country I have loosened the tongue of young American poets. I have been told by many of our young singers that my success of Nineveh [1907] encouraged them to break the harassing chains of Puritan tradition [Introduction p.xv]

Poet Francis Saltus Saltus was inspired by Charles Baudelaire, and his unpracticed style occasionally was compared to the French poet's more refined experimentation. He embraced the most debauched lifestyle of the French decadents and celebrated that life in his own poetry. At the time, mostly before Baju's Le Décadent, this frivolous poetry on themes of alcohol and depravity found little success and no known support from those who were part of the Decadent movement. The younger brother of Francis, writer Edgar Saltus had more success. He had some interaction with Oscar Wilde, and he valued decadence in his personal life. For a time, his work exemplified both the ideals and style of the movement, but a significant portion of his career was in traditional journalism and fiction that praised virtue. At the time when he was flourishing, however, multiple contemporary critics, as well as other decadent writers, explicitly considered him one of them. Writer James Huneker was exposed to the Decadent movement in France and tried to bring it with him to New York. He has been lauded to his dedication to this cause throughout his career, but it has been suggested that, while he lived as a decadent and heralded their work, his own work was more frustrated, hopeless, and empty of the pleasure that had attracted him to the movement in the first place. Largely, he focused on cynically describing the impossibility of a true American decadence.

== Critical studies ==
German doctor and social critic Max Nordau wrote a lengthy book titled Degeneration (1892). It was an examination of decadence as a trend, and specifically attacked several people associated with the Decadent movement, as well as other figures throughout the world who deviated from cultural, moral, or political norms. His language was colorful and vitriolic, often invoking the worship of Satan. What made the book a success was its suggestion of a medical diagnosis of "degeneration", a neuro-pathology that resulted in these behaviors. It also helped that the book named such figures as Oscar Wilde, Algernon Charles Swinburne, Paul Verlaine, and Maurice Barrès, members of the Decadent movement who were in the public eye.

In 1930, Italian art and literature critic Mario Praz completed a broad study of morbid and erotic literature, translated and published in English as The Romantic Agony (1933). The study included decadent writing (such as Baudelaire and Swinburne), but also anything else that he considered dark, grim, or sexual in some way. His study centered on the 18th and 19th centuries. The danger of such literature, he believed, is that it unnaturally elevated the instinctive bond between pain and pleasure and that, no matter the artists' intention, the essential role of art is to educate and teach culture.

== Decadent authors and artists ==
=== Writers ===
French

- Jules Barbey d'Aurevilly (1808–1889)
- Charles Baudelaire (1821–1867)
- Maurice Barrès (1862–1923)
- Henri Barbusse (1873–1935)
- Léon Bloy (1846–1917)
- Paul Bourget (1852–1935)
- Élémir Bourges (1852–1925)
- René Boylesve (1867–1926)
- Jean Bertheroy (1858–1927)
- Félicien Champsaur (1858–1934)
- Tristan Corbière (1845–1875)
- Édouard Dujardin (1861–1949)
- Jacques d'Adelswärd-Fersen (1880–1923)
- Remy de Gourmont (1858–1915)
- Joris-Karl Huysmans (1848–1907)
- Jules Laforgue (1860–1887)
- Jean Lorrain (1855–1906)
- Jean Lombard (1854–1891)
- Pierre Loti (1850–1923)
- Camille Mauclair (1872–1945)
- Catulle Mendès (1841–1909)
- Octave Mirbeau (1848–1917)
- Gabriel Mourey (1865–1943)
- Robert de Montesquiou (1855–1921)
- Joséphin Péladan (1858–1918)
- Georges de Peyrebrune (1841–1917)
- Rachilde (1860–1953)
- Hugues Rebell (1867–1905)
- Arthur Rimbaud (1854–1891)
- Maurice Rollinat (1846–1903)
- Marcel Schwob (1867–1905)
- Jean de Tinan (1874 –1898)
- Jane de La Vaudère (1857–1908)
- Paul Verlaine (1844–1896)
- Auguste Villiers de l'Isle-Adam (1838–1889)
- Renée Vivien (1877–1909)
- George-Albert Aurier (1865–1892)

Austrian-German

- Peter Altenberg (1859–1919)
- Hermann Bahr (1863–1934)
- Hugo von Hofmannsthal (1874–1929)
- Richard Beer-Hofmann (1866–1945)
- Alfred Kubin (1877–1959)
- Leopold von Sacher-Masoch (1836–1895)
- Arthur Schnitzler (1862–1931)
- George Sylvester Viereck (1884–1962)

Russian

- Innokenty Annensky (1855–1909)
- Lydia Zinovieva-Annibal (1866–1907)
- Konstantin Balmont (1867–1942)
- Andrei Bely (1880–1934)
- Valery Bryusov (1873–1924)
- Zinaida Gippius (1869–1945)
- Nikolai Klyuev (1884–1937)
- Dmitry Merezhkovsky (1866–1941)
- Nikolai Minsky (1855–1937)
- Yevdokiya Nagrodskaya (1866–1930)
- Vasily Rozanov (1856–1919)
- Polyxena Solovyova (1867–1924)
- Fyodor Sologub (1863–1927)

British

- John Barlas (1860–1914)
- Aubrey Beardsley (1872–1898)
- Max Beerbohm (1872–1956)
- Richard Francis Burton (1821–1890)
- Katherine Harris Bradley (1846–1914)
- Edith Emma Cooper (1862–1913)
- Marie Corelli (1855–1924)
- John Davidson (poet) (1857–1909)
- Ernest Dowson (1867–1900)
- Florence Farr (1860–1917)
- Richard Le Gallienne (1866–1947)
- John Gray (poet) (1866–1934)
- Lafcadio Hearn (1850–1904)
- William Thomas Horton (1864–1919)
- Lionel Johnson (1867–1902)
- Charles Francis Keary (1848–1917)
- Vernon Lee (1856–1935)
- Arthur Machen (1863–1947)
- Walter Pater (1839–1894)
- Charles Ricketts (1866–1931)
- Frederick Rolfe (1860–1913)
- Olivia Shakespear (1863–1938)
- M. P. Shiel (1865–1947)
- Robert Smythe Hichens (1864–1950)
- Algernon Charles Swinburne (1837–1909)
- Arthur Symons (1865–1945)

Irish

- George Moore (1852–1933)
- Oscar Wilde (1854–1900)
- W. B. Yeats (1865–1939)

Italian

- Arrigo Boito (1842–1918)
- Camillo Boito (1836–1914)
- Sergio Corazzini (1886–1907)
- Gabriele D'Annunzio (1863–1938)
- Grazia Deledda (1871–1936)
- Carlo Dossi (1849–1910)
- Antonio Fogazzaro (1842–1911)
- Guido Gozzano (1883–1916)
- Giovanni Pascoli (1855–1912)
- Luigi Pirandello (1867–1936)
- Giuseppe Rovani (1818–1874)
- Italo Svevo (1861–1928)
- Iginio Ugo Tarchetti (1839–1869)

Polish

- Stanisław Przybyszewski (1868–1927)
- Kazimierz Przerwa-Tetmajer (1865–1940)
- Jan Kasprowicz (1860–1926)
- Waclaw Rolicz-Lieder (1866–1912)
- Tadeusz Miciński (1873–1918)
- Antoni Lange (1862–1929)
- Stanisław Ignacy Witkiewicz (1885–1939)
- Kazimiera Zawistowska (1870–1902)

Belgian

- Jean Delville (1867–1953)
- Georges Eekhoud (1854–1927)
- Théodore Hannon (1851–1916)
- Iwan Gilkin (1858–1924)
- Camille Lemonnier (1844–1913)
- Pierre Louÿs (1870–1925)
- Maurice Maeterlinck (1862–1949)
- Georges Rodenbach (1855–1898)
- Emile Verhaeren (1855–1916)
- Karel van de Woestijne (1878–1929)

Dutch

- Louis Couperus (1863–1923)
- Lodewijk van Deyssel (1864–1952)

Spanish

- Melchor Almagro San Martín (1882–1947)
- Emilio Carrere (1881–1947)
- Antonio de Hoyos y Vinent (c.1884–1940)
- José María Llanas Aguilaniedo (1875–1921)
- Isaac Muñoz (1881–1925)
- Álvaro Retana (1890–1970)
- Ramón María del Valle-Inclán (1866–1936)

American

- Clark Ashton Smith (1893–1961)
- David Park Barnitz (1878–1901)
- Gelett Burgess (1866–1951)
- H. P. Lovecraft (1890–1937)
- Samuel Loveman (1887–1976)
- Robert W. Chambers (1865–1933)
- Ralph Adams Cram (1863–1942)
- Harry Crosby (1898–1929)
- Louise Imogen Guiney (1861–1920)
- Richard Hovey (1864–1900)
- Ben Hecht (1894–1964)
- Vincent O'Sullivan (1868–1940)
- Edgar Saltus (1855–1921)
- Francis Saltus Saltus (1849–1889)
- Philip Henry Savage (1868–1899)

Czech

- Jiří Karásek ze Lvovic (1871–1951)
- Karel Hlaváček (1874–1898)
- Arthur Breisky (1885–1910)

Romanian

- H. Bonciu (1893–1950)
- Dimitrie Batova (1909–1942)
- Mateiu Caragiale (1885–1936)
- Tașcu Gheorghiu (1910–1981)
- Constantin Al. Ionescu-Caion (1882–1918)
- D. Iacobescu (1893–1913)
- Dumitru Karnabatt (1877–1949)
- Alexandru Macedonski (1854–1920)
- Adrian Maniu (1891–1968)
- Alexandru Bogdan-Pitești (1870–1922)
- Radu D. Rosetti (1874–1964)
- Carol Scrob (1856–1913)
- Barbu Solacolu (1897–1976)
- Al. T. Stamatiad (1885–1955)
- Constant Tonegaru (1919–1952)
- Ion Vinea (1895–1964)

Others

- Viktors Eglītis (1877–1945), Latvian
- Vojislav Ilić (1860–1894), Serbian
- Joel Lehtonen (1881–1934), Finnish
- Edith Södergran (1892–1923), Finnish
- Friedebert Tuglas (1886–1971), Estonian
- Gustav Suits (1883–1956), Estonian
- Hjalmar Söderberg (1869–1941), Swedish
- Eric Stenbock (1860–1895), Swedish
- José Juan Tablada (1871–1945), Mexican
- Fialho de Almeida (1857–1911), Portuguese
- António Nobre (1867–1900), Portuguese
- Ivan Cankar (1876–1918), Slovenian
- Oton Župančič (1878–1949), Slovenian
- Oscar A. H. Schmitz (1873–1931), German
- Sebastian Droste (1898–1927), German
- Hanns Heinz Ewers (1871–1943), German

=== Visual artists ===
Austrian-German

- Franz von Bayros (1866–1924)
- Max Klinger (1857–1920)
- Gustav Klimt (1862–1918)
- Franz Stuck (1863–1928)

Belgian

- Jan Frans De Boever (1872–1949)
- Jean Delville (1867–1953)
- Félicien Rops (1833–1898)
- Fernand Khnopff (1858–1921)

British

- Aubrey Beardsley (1872–1898)
- Louis Welden Hawkins (1849 –1910)
- William Thomas Horton (1864–1919)
- Charles Ricketts (1866–1931)

French

- Joseph Apoux (1846–1910)
- Edmond Aman-Jean (1858–1936)
- Edgar Maxence (1871–1954)
- Gustave Moreau (1826–1898)
- Manuel Orazi (1860–1934)
- Odilon Redon (1840–1916)
- Georges Rochegrosse (1859–1938)
- Carlos Schwabe (1866–1926)
- Alexandre Séon (1855–1917)
- Henri de Toulouse-Lautrec (1864–1901)

Other

- Alastair (artist) (1887–1969), German
- Carel de Nerée tot Babberich (1880–1909), Dutch
- Ramón Casas (1866–1932), Spanish
- Harry Clarke (1889–1931), Irish
- Edvard Munch (1863–1944), Norwegian

== Bibliography ==
- (1906) A Game at Love, and Other Plays. New York: Brentano's.
- (1907) The House of the Vampire. New York: Moffat, Yard & Company.
- (1907) Nineveh and Other Poems. New York: Moffat, Yard & Company.
- (1910) Confessions of a Barbarian. New York: Moffat, Yard & Company.
- (1912) The Candle and the Flame. New York: Moffat, Yard & Company.
- (1916) Songs of Armageddon & Other Poems. New York: Mitchell Kennerley.
- (1919) Roosevelt: A Study in Ambivalence. New York: Jackson Press, Inc.
- (1923) Rejuvenation: How Steinach Makes People Young. New York: Thomas Seltzer [as George F. Corners].
- (1924) The Three Sphinxes and Other Poems. Girard, Kansas: Haldeman-Julius Company.
- (1928) My First Two Thousand Years: The Autobiography of the Wandering Jew. New York: The Macaulay Company [with Paul Eldridge].
- (1930) Glimpses of the Great. New York: The Macaulay Company.
- (1930) Mario Praz, The Romantic Agony, 1930 ISBN 0-19-281061-8
- (1930) Salome: The Wandering Jewess. My First 2,000 Years of Love. New York, H. Liveright.
- (1930) Spreading Germs of Hate. New York: H. Liveright [with a foreword by Colonel Edward M. House].
- (1931) My Flesh and Blood. A Lyric Autobiography, with Indiscreet Annotations. New York: H. Liveright.
- (1932) The Invincible Adam. London: Gerald Duckworth & Co. [with Paul Eldridge].
- (1932) Strangest Friendship: Woodrow Wilson and Colonel House. New York: H. Liveright.
- (1937) The Kaiser on Trial. New York: The Greystone Press.
- (1938) Before America Decides. Foresight in Foreign Affairs. Cambridge, Mass.: Harvard University Press [with Frank P. Davidson].
- (1941) The Seven Against Man. Flanders Hall.
- (1949) All Things Human. New York: Sheridan House [as Stuart Benton].
- (1952) Men into Beasts. Fawcett Publication.
- (1952) Gloria: A Novel. London: Gerald Duckworth & Co.
- (1953) The Nude in the Mirror. New York: Woodford Press.
- (1969) Philippe Jullian, Esthétes et Magiciens, 1969;
- (1971) Philippe Jullian, Dreamers of Decadence, 1971.
- (1979) Richard Gilman, Decadence: The Strange Life of an Epithet, 1979.
- (1995) David Weir, "Decadence and the Making of Modernism" (1995). ISBN 978-0-87023-991-5
- (2018) Brian Stableford "Decadence and Symbolism: A showcase Anthology" (2018). ISBN 978-1-943813-58-2

== See also ==
- Absinthe
- Belle Époque
- Pre-Raphaelite Brotherhood
- Socialist realism § Soviet Union — Stalinist use of "decadent art" as career-destroying label and political accusation
- Degenerate art — Nazi Party use of term to prohibit modern art
