= Breisky =

Breisky is a surname. Notable people with the surname include:

- August Breisky (1832–1889), Czech doctor and educator
- Arthur Breisky (1885–1910), Czech writer
- Michael Breisky (born 1940), Austrian diplomat
- Walter Breisky (1871–1944), Austrian jurist, civil servant, and politician
