= The Savoy (periodical) =

1896 London literary magazine

The name Savoy was borrowed from the new London hotel and was intended to be suggestive of modernity and opulence.

The Savoy was a magazine of literature, art, and criticism published in eight numbers from January to December 1896 in London. It featured work by authors such as W. B. Yeats, Max Beerbohm, Joseph Conrad, Aubrey Beardsley and William Thomas Horton. Only eight issues of the magazine were published: two quarterly (January, April) and six monthly (July-December). The publisher was Leonard Smithers, a controversial friend of Oscar Wilde who was also known as a pornographer. Among other publications by Smithers were rare erotic works and unique items such as books bound in human skin.

== History ==
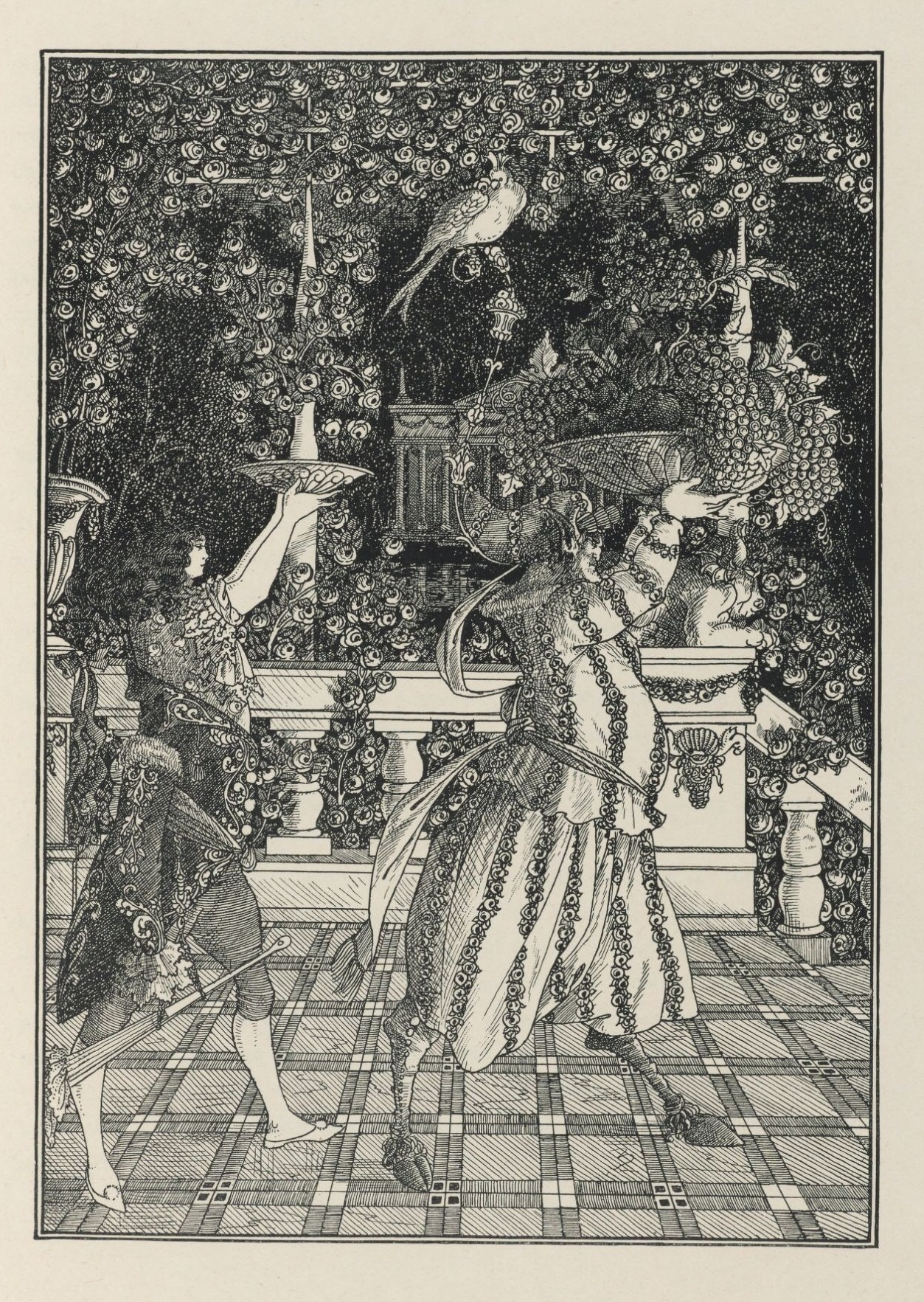
Aubrey Beardsley's "Fruit Bearers" from The Savoy, 1896

The Savoy was founded as a competitor to The Yellow Book and to provide work for members of the Decadent movement as it began to decline with the imprisonment of Oscar Wilde. The magazine was started by Leonard Smithers, writer Arthur Symons (The Symbolist Movement In Literature) and artist Aubrey Beardsley. It is considered a little magazine, and was described as "a manifesto in revolt against Victorian materialism". The name was inspired by the Savoy Hotel, a glamorous hotel in London which opened in 1889 and became infamous for being the location for Oscar Wilde's trysts.

Hubert Crackanthorpe tried to convince Grant Richards to join him in buying The Savoy but the plan never came to fruition. The magazine folded in December 1896 with its eighth issue. In the final issue, Symons considered its failure:

Our first mistake was in giving so much for so little money; our second, in abandoning a quarterly for a monthly issue. The action of Messrs. Smith and Son in refusing to place 'The Savoy' on their bookstalls, on account of the reproduction of a drawing by Blake, was another misfortune. And then, worst of all, we assumed that there were very many people in the world who really cared for art, and really for art's sake.

== Content ==
Symons attempted to distance the magazine from the Decadent movement and the controversy surrounding Wilde by writing, "We are not Realists, or Romanticists, or Decadents" in his editorial note in the first issue. However, he went on to write, "For us, all art is good which is good art", which is very similar to the Decadent creed of "art for art's sake." Yeats, who contributed several pieces to the magazine, described its fellow writers as "outlaws" and believed that the magazine waged "warfare on the British public at a time when we had all against us". Poet Rubén Darío praised the magazine and Symons: "For me, Symons is appealing since, for many years, I was enthused with his efforts for the sake of Beauty in his unforgettable magazine, Savoy, the very refined intellectual magazine."

== See also ==
- The Hobby Horse
