= Amy Audrey Locke =

English historian (1881–1916)

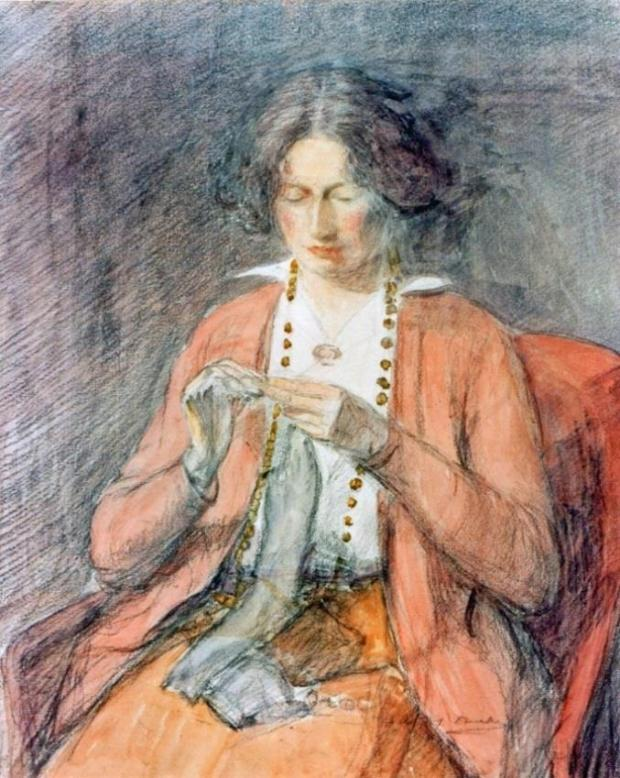
- Portrait of Locke by Amy Drucker (1915).
- Born: 1881
- Died: 19 June 1916 (aged 34–35)
- Burial place: St Matthew's Church, Otterbourne
- Education: Somerville College, Oxford
- Occupation: Historian
- Years active: 1903-1916
- Notable work: The Seymour Family (1911)

Amy Audrey Locke (1881 – 19 June 1916) was an English historian.

== Early life ==
Locke was born in Otterbourne, Hampshire, the only child of her parents. She came from a family of modest means. Her grandfather had been a chimney sweep, and her father, Alfred Locke, was a butler at Winchester College who eventually became its porter. Locke went by her middle name, Audrey, throughout her life.

=== Education ===
Locke attended St Swithun's School, Winchester, and became the first recipient of the Charlotte Yonge scholarship. The scholarship was named for Charlotte M. Yonge, a novelist of renown who also originated from Otterbourne. For her achievement, Locke received a letter of congratulations from the Princess of Wales, later Queen Alexandra. Locke would be the only recipient of the award to meet Yonge in person.

The scholarship enabled Locke to read Modern History at Somerville College of the University of Oxford in 1900. Women would not be permitted to graduate with a degree from Oxford until 1920. Female students therefore undertook the same examinations as male peers, but were awarded a certificate attesting that they had completed the required examinations rather than a formal degree. Locke was subsequently awarded a certificate with 2.1 honours.

== Career ==
In September 1903, Locke began working at Victoria County History (VCH). VCH, founded in 1899, employed predominantly young women to research and draft a written history "of every English county and parish". At this time, women historians were often pigeon-holed into research or supportive positions to male historians. Between 1905 and 1911, women wrote 78 per cent of the series' histories, and conducted most of the research, though few were credited in VCH's published volumes.

Locke's contributions to the project concerned her home county of Hampshire; they would be published in the third volume of the VCH project in 1908. She conducted fieldwork by travelling to sites by bicycle. The final publication, edited by William Page, credits Locke as the author for its essays on Selborne, Fawley and Buddlesgate, and she received praise in The Athenaeum for her work on Winchester. Locke also contributed to entries on Nottinghamshire and Worcestershire in later volumes.

Locke earned a reputation as a capable researcher. In September 1908, John Horace Round wrote to Page requesting help finding wills, stating he had been told about Locke's ability to locate them. Indeed, by November, Locke had settled Round's question. After her death, Page described Locke as "one of [his] most able assistants," and opined that she would have "made a name in literature" had she survived her 1916 illness.

=== Independent publications ===
The Seymour family commissioned Locke to study their lineage, resulting in her 1911 publication, The Seymour Family. In this work, Locke was noted to interpret Jane Seymour as more personally ambitious than other contemporary Tudor historians. While delivering largely positive reviews, the Daily News and Saturday Review both mistakenly referred to Locke as a man. The Evening Standard described the book as "extremely interesting [and] well written."

The next year, the Hanbury family, a lineage including John Hanbury, commissioned her to write a similar history of their ancestry. Locke's work for the Hanburys would be published posthumously in 1916. The work met with a positive reception in the East London Observer and Morning Post, with the latter mourning Locke's "peculiar genius."

In 1913, Locke published an entry into Kenneth Norman Bell's English History Source Books anthology, covering English history. Edited by Samuel Edward Winbolt, Locke's edition was entitled War and Misrule 1307-1399. Also that year, she compiled an anthology of prose and poetry centering on Winchester, entitled In Praise of Winchester, described by The Scotsman as a "labour of love" for the capital city of Locke's home county. Some time afterwards, Locke was commissioned by the Plough Court pharmacy (precursor to GSK plc) to write a book about its history.

=== Entry into artistic circles ===
Locke's later friendship with William Thomas Horton, and her frequenting of the British Museum's library, brought her into the acquaintanceship of writers including H. Rider Haggard, Ernest Rhys, and W. B. Yeats.

Some requested Locke's help with research to aid their literary endeavours. For adventure novelist Haggard, Locke conducted research into Ancient Egypt in early 1912, and she assisted Yeats as early as 1913. Most notably, she researched Joseph Damer (d. 1720) of the Dawson-Damer family for Yeats, a lineage that was of interest to him.

Artist Amy Drucker was also one of Locke's friends; she painted Locke in 1915, and sent a wreath to Locke's funeral in 1916.

== Personal life ==
=== Relationship with Arundell Esdaile ===
Locke's work often brought her to the segregated women's section of the British Museum's reading room. There, she met librarian Arundell Esdaile, and the pair developed a romantic interest in each other. They did not act on their feelings, though Esdaile wrote Locke a volume of poetry. Esdaile was married, and Locke feared disappointing her parents by becoming involved with Esdaile.

Esdaile wrote of one of their meetings:

That evening we had found a meeting-place.
We sat together by the fire a space,
She knitted, and I smoked, who could not knit,
Mere useless man! But held her skein of wool
Up to be wound. So between silences
We talked ... Sure am I that none
Who had been there to see us, hear us speak
Indifferently almost, - had seen in us
The two poor secret lovers that we were
Met for an hour of stolen and hazardous
Gladness.

=== Relationship with William Horton and friendship with W. B. Yeats ===
Around 1908, Locke met William Thomas Horton, illustrator and creative collaborator of W. B. Yeats. Locke, who shared Horton's interest in the occult, soon became Horton's companion and muse. Horton dedicated his 1910 publication, The Way of the Soul, to Locke. The pair, who lived not far from each other in Hampstead, moved into a property in Cartwright Gardens together in 1912. This brought them in close proximity to Yeats' home; they visited and corresponded with him often. He regarded both Horton and Locke as personal friends after meeting Locke for the first time in June 1913.

Yeats was of the view that Horton and Audrey's relationship was platonic. In dedicating his 1925 work, A Vision, to the memory of Horton and Locke, he described the pair's arrangement. Yeats was likely also attracted to Locke, as believed by biographers George Mills Harper, Winifred Dawson, and Jad Adams.

== Interest in the occult ==
Through her relationship with Horton, Locke nurtured an interest in the occult. After Horton introduced Locke to his creative collaborator W. B. Yeats in June 1913, the trio experimented with automatic writing together.

Locke also wrote for the Occult Review. She reviewed Horton's The Way of the Soul in December 1910, and discussed William Blake's Illustrations of the Book of Job in the magazine's February 1911 edition.

== Death ==
In early 1916, Locke underwent an operation for mastoiditis shortly after completing her history of the Hanburys. She fell seriously ill after experiencing complications during her recovery, and died at her home in London on 19 June 1916.

Locke was buried in St. Matthew's Churchyard in Otterbourne, next to the grave of Charlotte M. Yonge. Her death was mourned by prominent members of her home town. Her funeral was attended by Horton and her parents, as well as Lady Laura Ridding, and Edith Ashley, wife of Tankerville Chamberlayne. For some years after her death, her father maintained a scholarship in her honour for academically gifted girls in Hampshire.

Locke's death had a severe negative impact on Horton's mental health. Furthermore, he would, until his own death in 1919, see visions of Locke. He wrote to Yeats about his belief that he was being visited by her apparition, and also spoke of them with Ernest Rhys, an acquaintance of Locke and friend of Horton.

== Unpublished and posthumous works ==
- Plough Court, the Story of a Notable Pharmacy, 1715–1927 (1927): When Locke died before she could complete her history of the precursor to GlaxoSmithKline, Esdaile completed her manuscript. It was published after final revisions by Ernest Cripps.
- Tiny Tim's Flyship (c. 1905–1916): Locke and Horton collaborated on an unpublished children's book. Locke provided the words and Horton illustrated the story.

== Legacy ==
Yeats' 1925 poem 'All Souls' Night,' an epilogue to A Vision, describes Locke's relationship with William Horton: "Nothing could bring him, when his lady died / Anodyne for his love."

In 2014, Winifred Dawson published a biography of Locke, entitled The Porter's Daughter, the life of Amy Audrey Locke.
