= David Weir =

David Weir may refer to:

- David Weir (academic) (born 1947), American literature scholar
- David Weir (journalist) (born 1939), American journalist
- David Weir (Scottish footballer) (born 1970), Scottish footballer and football manager
- Davie Weir (footballer) (1863–1933), English footballer
- David Weir (politician) (1881–1929), Australian politician
- David Weir (writer) (1934–2011), British TV and film script writer
- David Weir (athlete) (born 1979), British Paralympic wheelchair athlete
