= Joseph Apoux =

French painter (1846–1910)

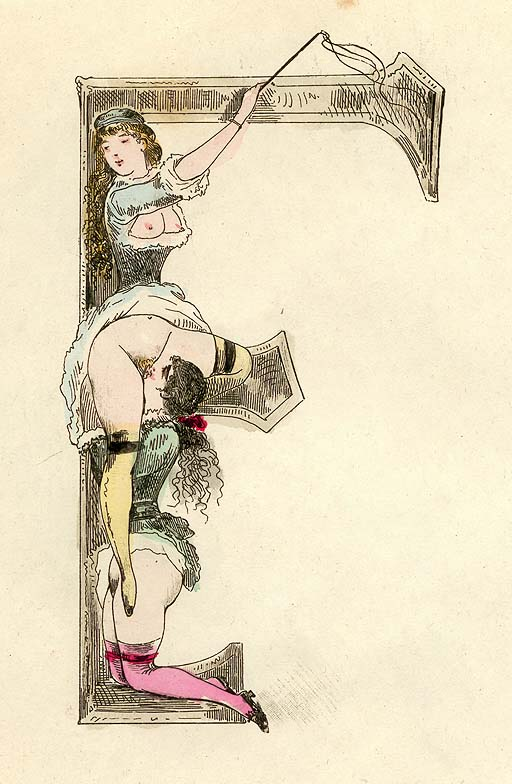
"F", Pornographic Alphabet, c. 1880

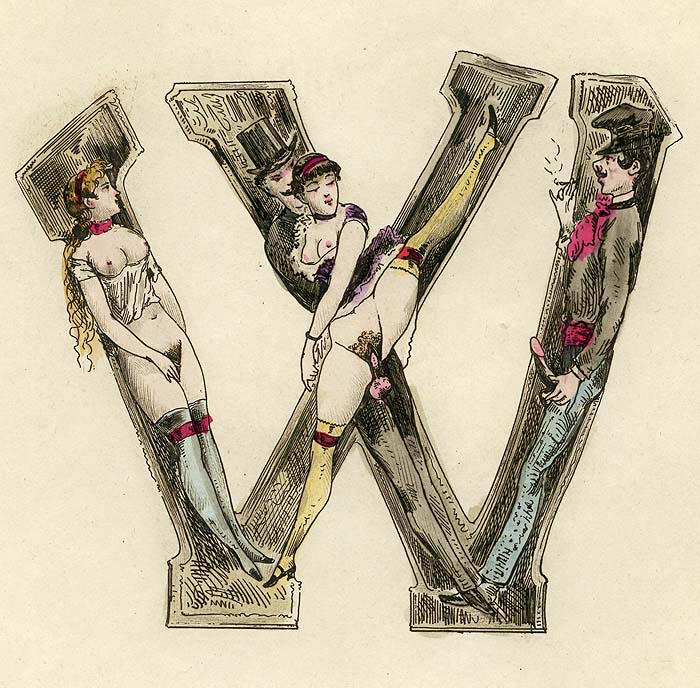
"W", ibid., c. 1880

Joseph Zacharie Jacques Apoux (5 November 1846, Le Blanc – 11 November 1910, Le Kremlin-Bicêtre) was a French painter, illustrator and engraver of the late 19th century associated with the Decadent movement.

== Biography ==
Joseph Apoux studied painting and drawing under Jean-Léon Gérôme. He then specialized in aquatint and drypoint engraving. He exhibited in salons from 1880 and participated in the international exhibition Blanc et Noir ('Black and White') in 1886.

Apoux produced numerous series of erotic engravings and prints, including Pornographic Alphabet (c. 1880), Fantastic Reveries, and Etching Caprices (c. 1890). His work was published by the L. Joly publishing house (Quai Saint-Michel) and the print merchant René Pincebourde (Rue de Verneuil) between 1880 and 1900.

Apoux lived his whole working life in Paris and married his first cousin Clarisse Camus, who bore him three children: Clarisse, who became a milliner and dressmaker, Marie, and Henri.

== Bibliography ==
- Oliver, Valerie Cassel, ed. (2011). "Apoux, Joseph". In Benezit Dictionary of Artists. Oxford Art Online. Oxford University Press.
- Spiller, Monika (2021). "Apoux, Joseph". In Beyer, Andreas; Savoy, Bénédicte; and Tegethoff, Wolf (eds.). Allgemeines Künstlerlexikon - Internationale Künstlerdatenbank. De Gruyter.
- "Apoux (Joseph-Jacques-Zacharie)", Revue du Centre: littérature, histoire, archéologie, sciences, statistique et beaux-arts, 15 June 1886.
- "Apoux (Joseph)", Dictionnaire général des artistes de l'école française depuis l'origine des arts du dessin jusqu'à nos jours (Paris, 1887)
- "Joseph Apoux", The British Museum Online. Retrieved 2 December 2021.
- "'Les Crêpes', an amusing Belle Époque French erotic etching by Joseph Apoux", MarkHill: Antiques and Modern Design. Retrieved 2 December 2021.
