= Jane de La Vaudère =

French novelist, poet and playwright

Jeanne Scrive
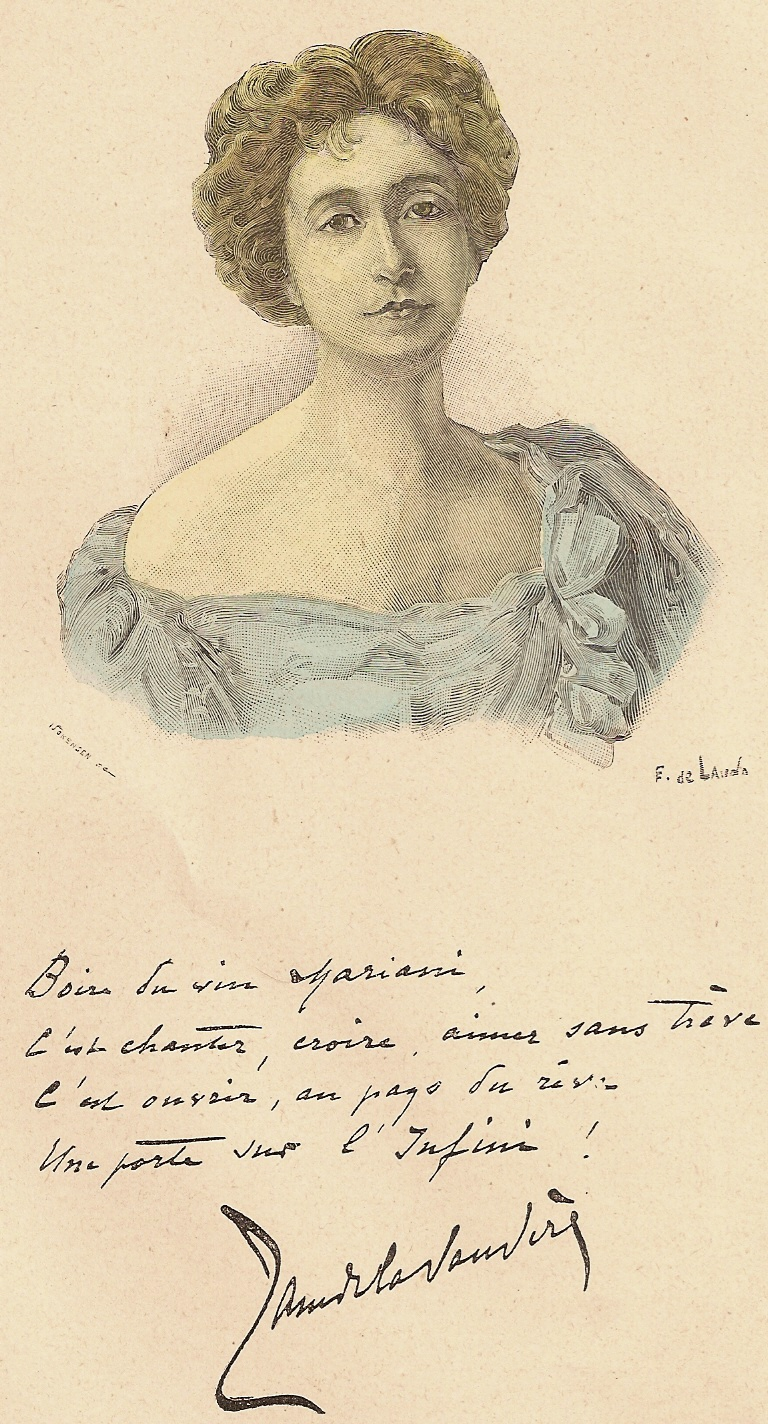
- Born: 15 April 1857; Paris, France
- Died: 26 July 1908 (aged 51); Paris, France
- Occupation: Novelist
- Writing career
- Pen name: Jane de la Vaudère
- Language: French
- Genres: Science fiction and fantasy

Signature
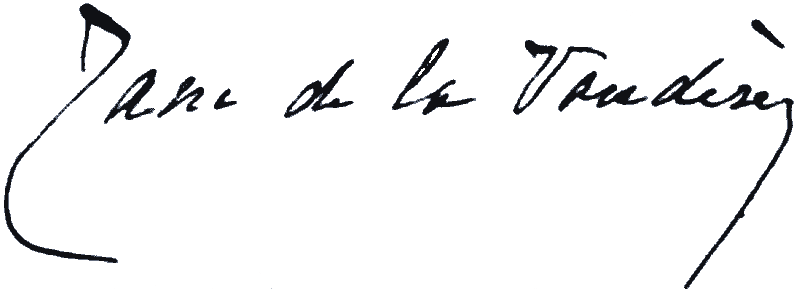

Jane de la Vaudère (15 April 1857 – 26 July 1908) was the pen name of Jeanne Scrive, a French novelist, poet and playwright.

Jane de la Vaudère was born on 15 April 1857 in Paris. Her father was a famous doctor, Gaspard-Léonard Scrive, Surgeon-General of the French Army during the Crimean War. She is considered by contemporary critics a participant in the Decadent movement and Naturalism.

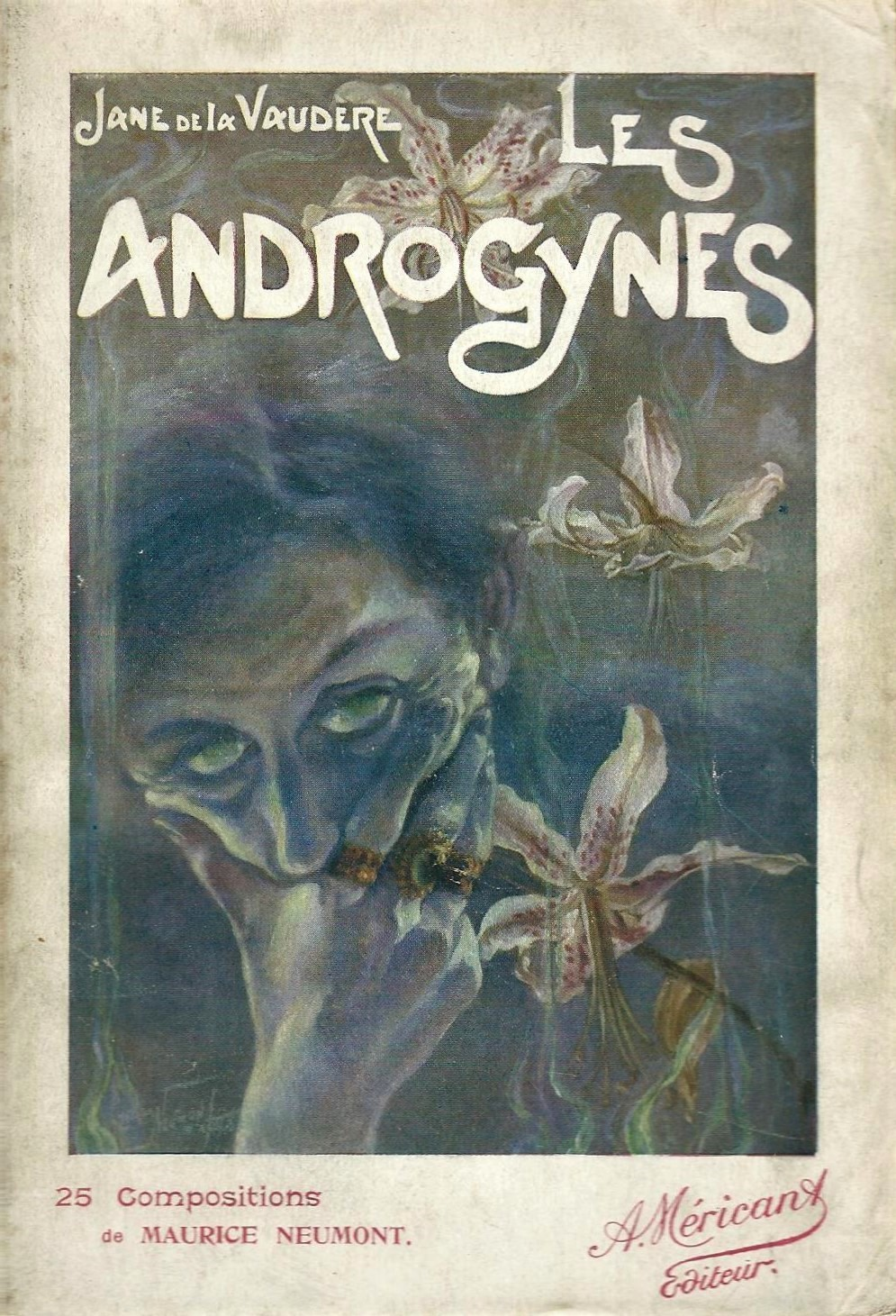
Front cover of Les Androgynes, illustrated by Maurice Neumont.

Her poetic works include Les Heures perdues, L'Eternelle chanson, Minuit, and Evocation. She is also remembered for a collection of Decadent novels and short stories, such as Les Androgynes (1903), Les Demi-Sexes (1897), or Les Sataniques (1897) — probably her masterpiece. She wrote exotic novels as well, including Les Courtisanes de Brahma, La Porte de Félicité or La Gueisha amoureuse.

She collaborated with the Théâtre du Grand Guignol. Vaudère died on 26 July 1908.

== Bibliography ==
Novels and Short Stories

- Folie d'Opium
- Mortelle étreinte
- L'Anarchiste
- Le Droit d'aimer
- Ambitieuse
- Les Demi-Sexes
- Les Sataniques
- Le Sang
- Les Frôleurs
- L'Amuseur
- Trois fleurs de volupté
- Le Harem de Syta
- Les Mousseuses
- L'Amazone du roi de Siam
- La Mystérieuse
- Les Androgynes
- Les Courtisanes de Brahma
- L'Expulsée
- La Gesha amoureuse
- Les Confessions galantes
- Rien qu'amante
- La Sorcière d'Ecbatane
- La Porte de Félicité
- Sapho : dompteuse
