= John Barlas =

Scottish poet and political activist

- Born: John Evelyn Barlas; 13 July 1860; Rangoon, Burma
- Died: 15 August 1914 (aged 54); Gartnavel Royal Asylum, Glasgow, Scotland
- Other name: Evelyn Douglas
- Education: Merchant Taylors' School; New College, Oxford
- Spouse: Eveline Honoria Nelson Davies (m. 1881)

John Evelyn Barlas (13 July 1860 – 15 August 1914), pseudonym Evelyn Douglas, was a Scottish poet and political activist of the late nineteenth century. He was a member of the decadent movement in literature, as well as a revolutionary socialist in politics. Eight books of his Swinburne-influenced verse were published between 1884 and 1893, including 1885's the Bloody Heart, 1887's Phantasmagoria: Dream-Fugues and 1889's Love Sonnets.

== Biography ==
Born in Burma, he was educated at Merchant Taylors' School and studied at New College, Oxford, where he befriended Oscar Wilde, who became an intimate companion.

Having served as an organizer for the Social Democratic Federation and as a contributor to William Morris' socialist journal Commonweal, he demonstrated in Trafalgar Square on Bloody Sunday. He was allegedly "batoned and floored" there, after which it is said he fell, bloodied, at the feet of Eleanor Marx. Barlas was briefly associated with the Rhymers' Club, having been sponsored by Ernest Dowson. His work, which was mostly devoid of socialist themes, was much admired by contemporary authors such as John Davidson and Henry Stephens Salt. He was also known by his friends as a brilliant conversationalist and a man of compelling personality and good looks.

Possessing both fragile mental health and intense emotions, Barlas was arrested on the morning of New Year's Eve, 1891 after walking to Westminster Bridge and firing a revolver three times at the House of Commons, apparently to show his contempt for Parliament. Although he was bailed out by Wilde, Barlas was eventually admitted to Gartnavel Asylum, Glasgow, where he spent much of his later life in severe mental illness. He died in 1914, aged 54, while still living in Gartnavel.

== Bibliography ==
- Cohen, Philip. John Evelyn Barlas, A Critical Biography: Poetry, Anarchism, and Mental Illness in Late-Victorian Britain. Rivendale Press, 2012. ISBN 978 1 904201 21 2
- Beckson, Karl. (ed.) Aesthetes and Decadents of the 1890s. Academy Chicago Publishers, 1981. ISBN 0-89733-044-7
- Lowe, David. John Barlas: Sweet Singer and Socialist. Cupar, Fife, 1915.
- Salt, Henry (ed.) Selections from the Poems of John E. Barlas. Elkin Mathews, 1925.
- Sloan, John (ed.) John Davidson: First of the Moderns. Oxford University Press, 1995. ISBN 0-19-818248-1
