= Karel Hlaváček =

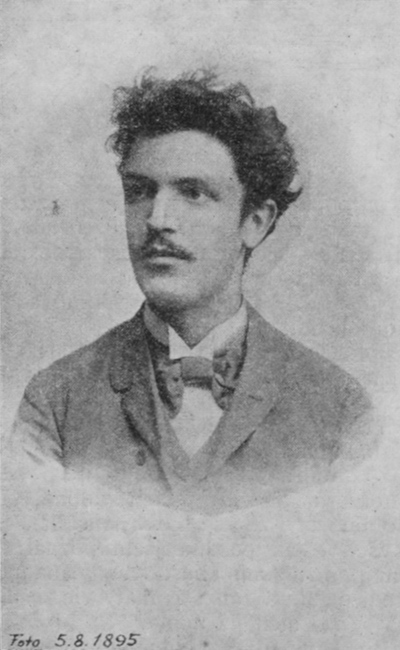
Karel Hlaváček in 1895

Karel Hlaváček (August 24, 1874 in Prague – June 15, 1898 in Prague) was a Czech Symbolist and Decadent poet and artist.

Hlaváček was born into a working class household in the Prague neighborhood of Libeň. He published his poetic works and art criticisms in the journal Moderní revue (Modern review). Hlavacek poems were notable for their musicality and phonic homonymy, and contained decadent interests of eroticism and decay, particularly with the symbolic use of his aristocratic vampire attacking young virgins in the poem Upír.

Hlaváček was also active as a sketch artist and created illustrations for the poems of Arnošt Prochazka. He was and heavily inspired by Edvard Munch, creating hallucinatory drawings, both in Symbolist and early expressionist style, suggesting anxieties about sex and religion. He was the founding member and the first president of the nationalist and athletic Sokol group in the Prague suburb of Libeň.

Hlaváček died of tuberculosis, aged 23.

There is a memorial plaque dedicated to the poet in U kříže, near his home in Old Libeň.

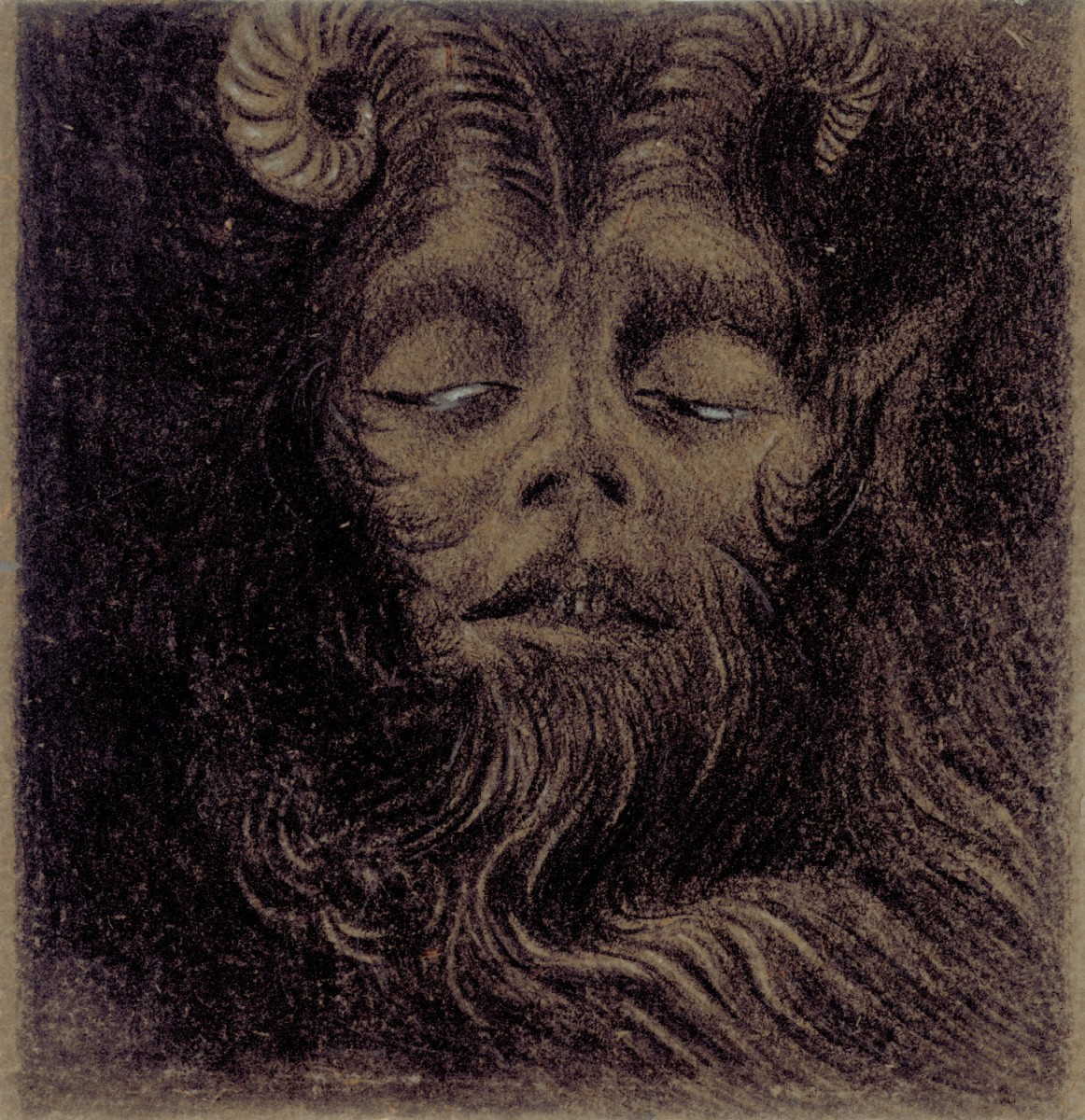
Faun, (1897)

== Works ==
- Sokolské sonety (Sonnets of falcon or Sonnets of Sokol) (1895)
- Pozdě k ránu (Late before morning) - Czech Symbolist book of poetry, written with musicality and unusual rhymes (1896)
- Mstivá kantiléna (Vindictive cantilena) - his most important work, a Decadent book, a poetic interpretation of the Geuzen (1898)
- Žalmy (Psalms) - unfinished and published posthumously, a collection of hymn-like poems, stylised as biblical Psalms. (1934)

== See also ==
- Alfred Kubin
