= Arthur Breisky =

Czech writer

Arthur Breisky (real name Arthur Vincenc Josef Breiský: May 14, 1885, Roudnice nad Labem near Prague – 1910, New York City, United States) was a Czech writer of Decadence.

He was a novelist, a translator, literary editor, and a playwright; wrote a number of reviews on modern literature and art. Was also known as a dandy and aesthetician, and a master of mystification both in his literary works and in real life.

Died as a lift boy, probably committed an error.

Born in Roudnice, Arthur started his education in Prague but moved with the family to Louny in 1899. Nowadays, there is a street in Louny named after Arthur Breisky.

== Outline of works ==
Best known books:

- Triumf zla (The Triumph of Evil) (1910)
- Dvě novely (Two stories) (1927)

Essays and critical reviews:

- Střepy zrcadel (Shattered Mirrors) (1928)

His correspondence and unpublished papers from 1902–1910 have been gathered and later published as a book V království chimér (In the Kingdom of Chimeras).

== See also ==
- Czech literature
