= David Weir (academic) =

American scholar (born 1947)

David Weir (/wɪər/; born 1947) is an American scholar who has written widely on the Decadent movement in literature and its impact in America. Weir is Professor Emeritus on the Faculty of Humanities and Social Sciences at The Cooper Union for the Advancement of Science and Art.

== Bibliography ==
- Decadence and the Making of Modernism (1995) ISBN 978-0870239915
- James Joyce and the Art of Mediation (1996) ISBN 978-0472106530
- Anarchy and Culture (Critical Perspectives on Modern Culture) (1997) ISBN 978-1558490840
- Brahma in the West: William Blake and the Oriental Renaissance (2003) ISBN 978-0791458181
- Decadent Culture in the United States: Art and Literature Against the American Grain, 1890-1926 (2009) ISBN 978-0791472781
- American Orient: Imagining the East from the Colonial Era Through the Twentieth Century (2011) ISBN 978-1558498792
