= Amy Drucker =

British artist and educator (1873–1951)

- Born: Amy Julia Drucker; 1873; London, England
- Died: November 1951 (aged 77–78)
- Education: St John's Wood Art School; Lambeth School of Art; Académie Colarossi
- Occupations: Artist and educator

Amy Julia Drucker (1873 – November 1951) was a British artist and educator of Jewish descent.

== Biography ==
The daughter of a wine merchant and his wife from Germany, Drucker was born in London, England, and grew up in Hampstead. She was educated at South Hampstead High School and studied art at St John's Wood Art School and the Lambeth School of Art, both in London, and at the Académie Colarossi in Paris, France. She had a studio in Bloomsbury. Besides paintings, watercolours and pastels, she also produced lithographs, miniatures, woodcut prints, drawings and etchings. She exhibited her work regularly from 1888 to 1949 at various venues in England, including at the Royal Academy in London. She also exhibited at the Paris Salon and had solo shows in Buenos Aires, Lima, Panama, Jerusalem, Beijing and Shanghai.

Drucker travelled extensively, spending time in the Europe, the Far East, South America, Palestine and Abyssinia, where was commissioned to paint a portrait of Haile Selassie. She made extensive drawings of the people and cultures she encountered on her travels and taught painting and printing in Calcutta, at the Jerusalem School of Art and gave private art lessons in London.

During World War I, Drucker served in the Women's Land Army. During World War II, she worked in a factory and as a night watchman. Drucker lived at Cartwright Gardens, off the Euston Road in London, from the early twentieth century until she died. After her death, two portfolios of her work were presented at the Royal Anthropological Institute. In 1952, an exhibition of her work was shown at the Ben Uri Gallery and a prize was awarded in two consecutive years in her name to a promising young Jewish artist. The Ben Uri Gallery holds several works by Drucker.

Her paintings include:

- The Aliens
- Wentworth Street at Night
- Arab Water Carriers
- For He had Great Possessions
