= Nicholas Kalmakoff =

Russian symbolic artist

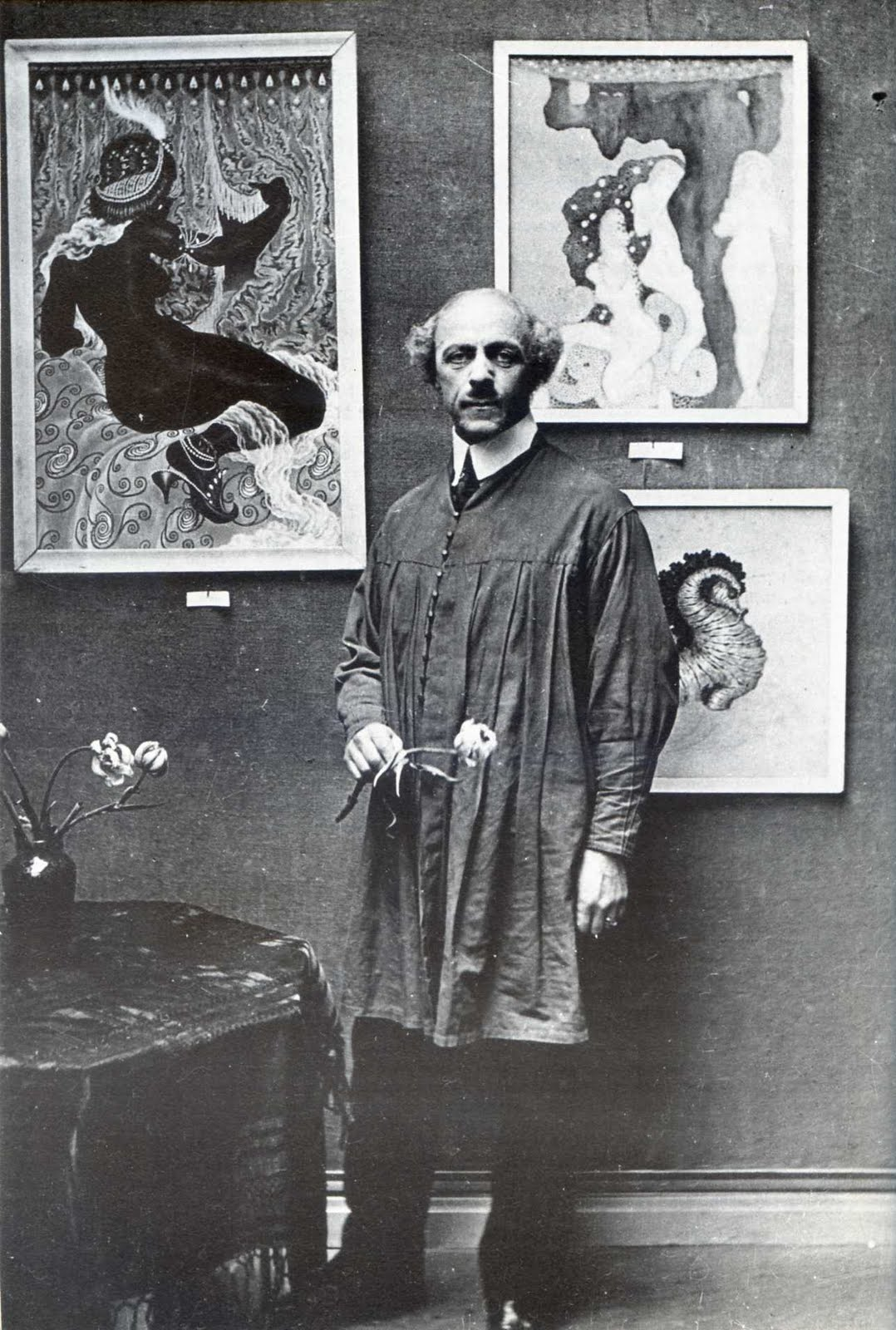
Kalmakoff in Paris (1928)

Nikolai Konstantinovich Kalmakov, known as Nicholas Kalmakoff (Russian: Николай Константинович Калмаков; 23 January 1873, Nervi, Italy – 2 February 1955, Chelles, France), was a Russian symbolist painter, graphic artist, and set designer whose work is characterized by motifs dealing with spirituality, occultism and sexuality.

== Biography ==
Kalmakoff was the son of a Russian general who was living in Italy and had married there. His interest in occultism may have been sparked when he was introduced to the tales of the Brothers Grimm and E. T. A. Hoffmann by his German governess. Around 1890, his family moved back to Russia and in 1895 he graduated from the Imperial School of Jurisprudence. Following that, he returned to Italy, where he became self-taught in painting and anatomy.

By 1900, he was once again in Russia; dividing his time between St. Petersburg and Moscow. Although he preferred to work alone, he maintained loose contacts with some artists' associations and with the St. Petersburg theater world, where he caused a sensation with his elaborate and taboo-breaking costumes and stage designs. He also worked as a book illustrator and made personal bookplates.

Shortly after the start of the First World War, Kalmakoff was drafted, but he spent only a short time on active service before being transferred to work in a field hospital. In 1920, during the Civil War, he left Russia and made his way to France. From 1924, he lived a reclusive life in Paris. An attempt to re-establish himself as a set designer was unsuccessful. His work remained little known and he died in obscurity, at a nursing home in Chelles.

Seven years after his death, in 1962, the art collectors Bertrand Collin du Bocage and Georges Martin du Nord discovered samples of his abandoned work in a large flea market to the north of Paris. Kalmakoff's works were finally exhibited at the Galerie Motte in February 1964.

In Russia, work by Kalmakoff can be seen at the Russian Museum, the Tretyakov Gallery, the Bakhrushin Museum and the Pushkin Museum.

== Gallery ==
Nikolai Konstantinovich Kalmakov - The Triumph of Joan of Arc

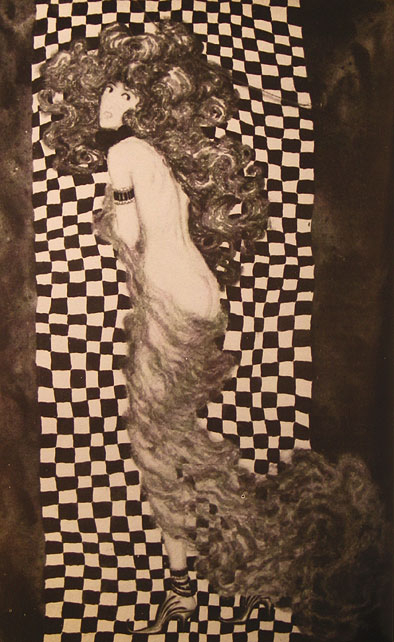
Costume for Salome, by
Oscar Wilde (Paris, 1926)

Muse, 1929

Seraph, c. 1915
