= Jiří Karásek ze Lvovic =

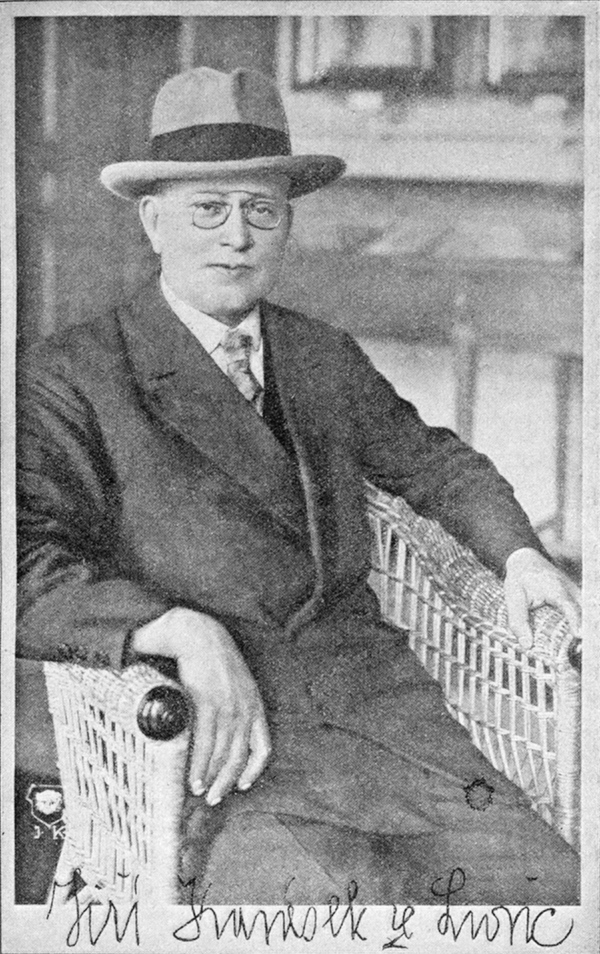
Jiří Karásek ze Lvovic

Jiří Karásek ze Lvovic (English: Jiří Karásek from Lvovice; 24 January 1871, Prague – 5 March 1951, Prague) was a Czech poet, writer and literary critic. He is a prominent representative of decadence in Czech literature. As a writer and reviewer he also used naturalistic and impressionistic styles.

== Biography ==
Karásek ze Lvovic studied theology at the Theological faculty in Prague, but he did not complete. Thereafter, he left Bohemia for one year and after his return he started working as a clerk in the post office. Soon after, he was appointed director of the library of the Ministry of Post, and director of the Postal Museum and Archive. In 1894 he founded, together with Ernst Stroll, the well known magazine Modern Review, in which he published mainly Czech and French decadent literature and art. Later, he published two magazines, intended for sexual reform – Hlas (Voice) and Nový Hlas (New voice).

During his lifetime he gathered together an extensive private library (48,000 volumes) and a collection of Slavic art and graphics (40,000 items). In 1922, he donated this collection to the Czechoslovak Sokol Organization, which was housed in the Tyrš house in Prague; with the condition that it be managed by him until the end of life. In 1954, the collection became part of the National Literature Archives.

Karásek was also a writer, author of many poems and prose works. Some of his novels are now categorized as science fiction literature. He was interested in occultism and was a member of the Czech society of hermetics "Hermetik Universalia". He was also a collector of paintings and his collection was one of the largest collections of modern art throughout Europe. It was later nationalized and exhibited in Czech museums.

He was openly homosexual despite the fact that it was illegal at the time, and in 1932 founded the Enlightenment and Social Association of Friendship (OSSP), which organized social events for LGBT people, and served as its chairman.

Almost forgotten, he died in Prague in 1951 of pneumonia.

== Literary works ==
- Zazděná okna (Walled-up windows), 1894 ;
- Sodoma (1895) – the first edition was banned ;
- Kniha aristokratická (An aristocratic book), 1896 ;
- Sexus necans (1897) ;
- Gotická duše (A gothic mind) (1900, revised issues 1905 and 1921) ;
- Romány tří mágů (Novels of three mages): Román Manfreda Macmillena (1907), Scarabaeus (1908), Ganymedes (1925) ;
- Ztracený ráj (Paradise lost), 1938 ;
- Zplozenci pekla (The spawns of hell), 1940, revised novel by Josef Jiří Kolár.
