= William Thomas Horton =

Belgian-born English artist, writer, and occultist 1864–1919

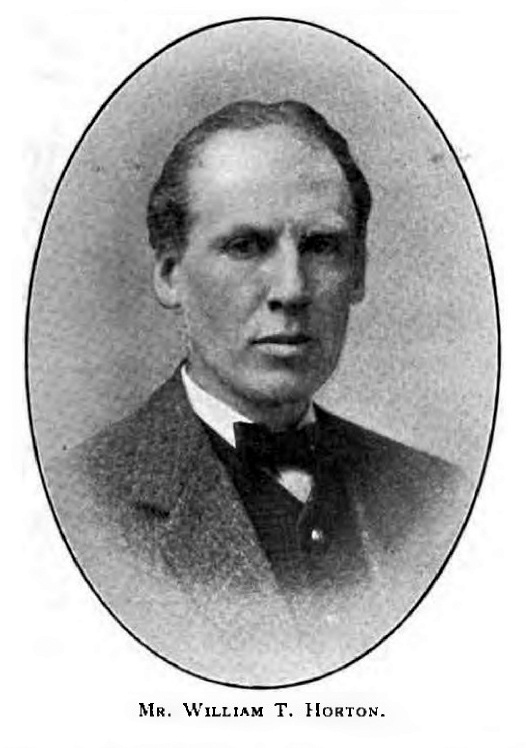
William Thomas Horton

William Thomas Horton (27 Jun 1864 – 19 Feb 1919) was a Belgian-born English artist, writer, and occultist connected to the symbolist and aestheticist movements. His drawings were largely unpublished during his lifetime. He has been described as "the only illustrator who came near Yeats's ideal of a Symbolist art composed entirely of images that could be recognised as meaningful by instinct rather than because of cultural conditioning." Another critic wrote that "though impeded by severe technical limitations... he could, when things happened to fall right — as they did most reliably with monstrous and sinister-grotesque subjects — achieve work of powerful suggestivity, not quite like that of anyone else."

== Biography ==
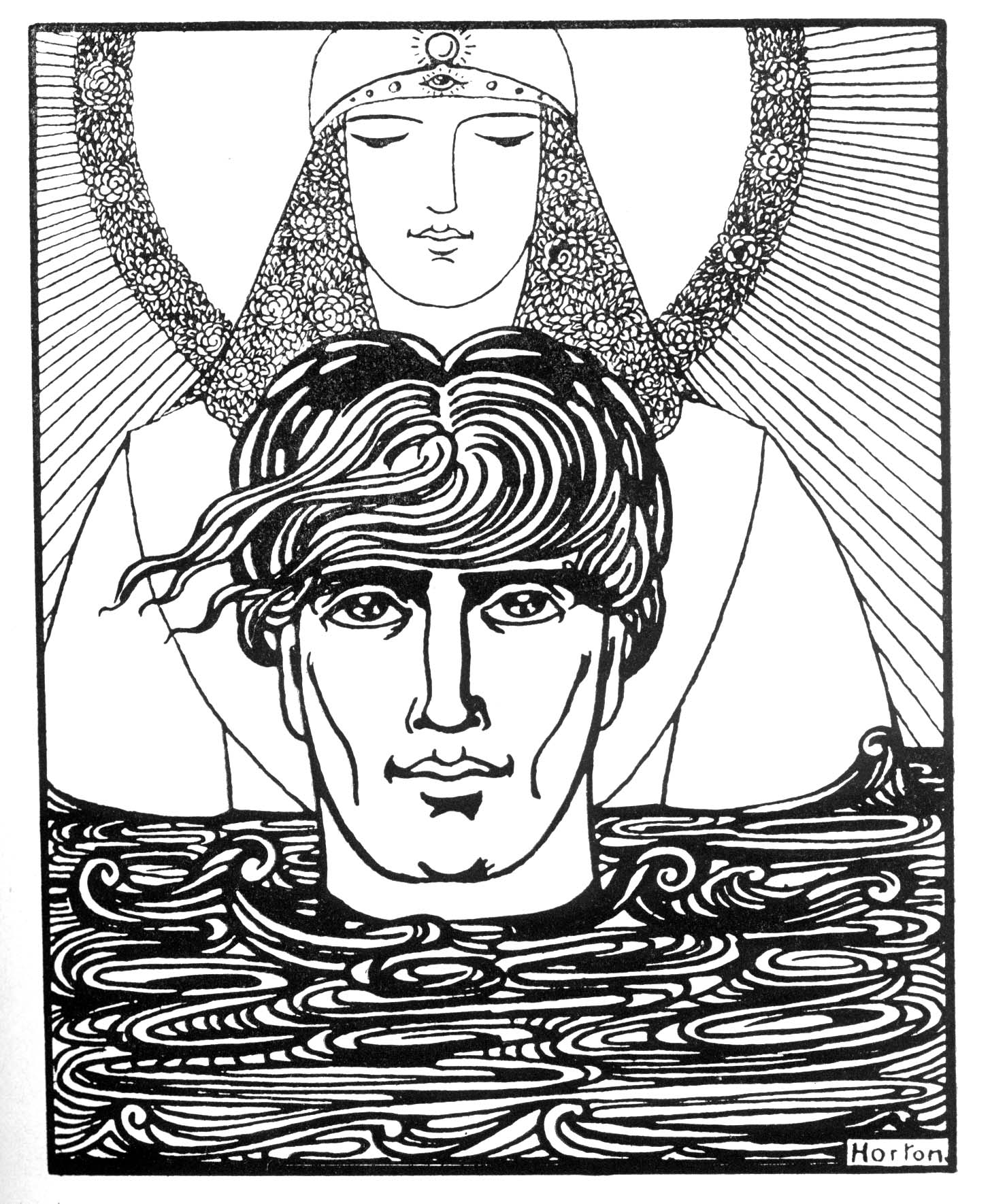
Image from Horton's The Way of the Soul (1910)

Horton was born in Brussels to English parents from Kent. After beginning school in Brussels, he moved with his family to Brighton, where he studied architecture. He continued his studies at the Royal Academy in London, but gave up on an architecture career in the early 1890s.

In Redhill he launched a magazine titled Whispers: A Magazine for Surrey Folk and published four issues. He began to pursue visual art, inspired by Aubrey Beardsley, and in 1896 his drawings were published in The Savoy, a magazine co-founded by Beardsley and Arthur Symons.

Horton collaborated with poet W. B. Yeats on a collection titled A Book of Images featuring an introduction by Yeats, published in 1898 by Unicorn Press. Subsequent books included an illustrated volume combining Edgar Allan Poe's "The Raven" and "The Pit and the Pendulum" (Leonard Smithers, 1899), a nursery rhyme collection titled The Grig's Book (1900), and The Way of the Soul (1910), which was both written and illustrated by Horton.

His friends included Yeats, H. Rider Haggard, Lady Gregory, and the writer Roger Ingpen, who edited and published a posthumous collection of Horton's drawings. From around 1910–12, he had a close and loving relationship with the historian Amy Audrey Locke, with whom he shared a house. She died unexpectedly in 1916. After her death, Horton continued to make drawings of her, and may have thought that he was able to communicate with her through spiritualist methods.

Horton is invoked as a ghost in the third and fourth stanzas of Yeats's "All Souls Night", a poem written in Oxford in 1920, and published in Yeats's 1928 collection 'The Tower'.

== Sources ==
- Crabb, Jon. “W.T. Horton (1864–1919),” Y90s Biographies. Yellow Nineties 2.0, edited by Lorraine Janzen Kooistra, Ryerson University Centre for Digital Humanities, 2019.
- Harper, George Mills. W.B. Yeats and W.T. Horton: The Record of an Occult Friendship. Atlantic Highlands, N.J.: Humanities Press, 1980.
- Ingpen, Roger. William Thomas Horton (1864-1919): A Selection of His Work with a Biographical Sketch. London: Ingpen and Grant, 1929.
- Peppin, Brigid. Fantasy: The Golden Age of Fantastic Illustration. New York: Watson-Guptill, 1975.
