= Mathematical fiction =

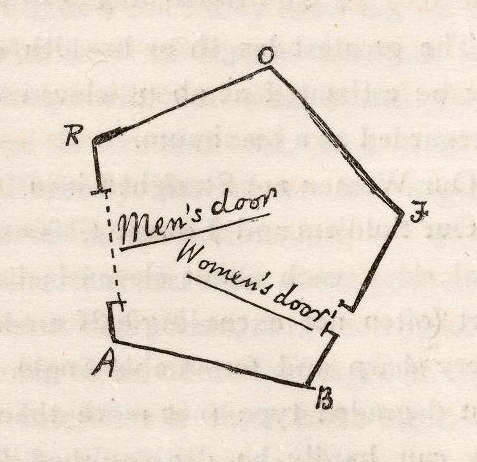
Illustration of a simple house in Flatland

Mathematical fiction is a genre of creative fictional work in which mathematics and mathematicians play important roles. The form and the medium of the works are not important. The genre may include poems, short stories, novels or plays; Comic books; films, videos, or audios. One of the earliest, and much studied, works of this genre is Flatland: A Romance of Many Dimensions, an 1884 satirical novella by the English schoolmaster Edwin Abbott Abbott. Mathematical fiction may have existed since ancient times, but it was recently rediscovered as a genre of literature; since then there has been a growing body of literature in this genre, and the genre has attracted a growing body of readers. For example, Abbott's Flatland, a 19th century novel spawned a sequel in the 20th century Sphereland and again in the 21st century Flatterland authored by Ian Stewart.

== A database of mathematical fiction ==
Alex Kasman, a professor of mathematics at the College of Charleston, who maintains a database of works that could possibly be included in this genre, has a broader definition for the genre: Any work "containing mathematics or mathematicians" has been treated as mathematical fiction. Accordingly, Gulliver's Travels by Jonathan Swift, War and Peace by Lev Tolstoy, Mrs. Warren's Profession by George Bernard Shaw, and several similar literary works appear in Kasman's database because these works contain references to mathematics or mathematicians, even though mathematics and mathematicians are not important in their plots. According to this broader approach, the oldest extant work of mathematical fiction is The Birds, a comedy by the ancient Greek playwright Aristophanes performed in 414 BCE. Kasman's database has a list of more than one thousand items of diverse categories like literature, comic books and films.

== See also ==
- Fourth dimension in literature
- List of films about mathematicians
