= 3-sphere =

Mathematical object

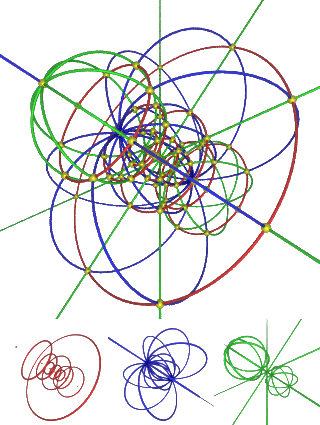
Stereographic projection of the hypersphere's parallels (red), meridians (blue) and hypermeridians (green). Because this projection is conformal, the curves intersect each other orthogonally (in the yellow points) as in 4D. All curves are circles: the curves that intersect ⟨0,0,0,1⟩ have infinite radius (= straight line). In this picture, the whole 3D space maps the surface of the hypersphere, whereas in the next picture the 3D space contained the shadow of the bulk hypersphere.

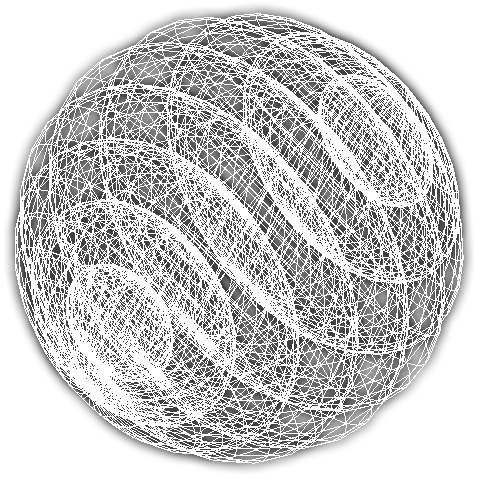
Direct projection of 3-sphere into 3D space and covered with surface grid, showing structure as stack of 3D spheres (2-spheres)

In mathematics, a hypersphere or 3-sphere is a 4-dimensional analogue of a sphere, and is the 3-dimensional n-sphere. In 4-dimensional Euclidean space, it is the set of points equidistant from a fixed central point. The interior of a 3-sphere is a 4-ball.

It is called a 3-sphere because topologically, the surface itself is 3-dimensional, even though it is curved into the 4th dimension. For example, when traveling on a 3-sphere, you can go north and south, east and west, or along a 3rd set of cardinal directions. This means that a 3-sphere is an example of a 3-manifold.

== Definition ==
In coordinates, a 3-sphere with center (C_{0}, C_{1}, C_{2}, C_{3}) and radius r is the set of all points (x_{0}, x_{1}, x_{2}, x_{3}) in real, 4-dimensional space (R^{4}) such that

$$\sum_{i=0}^3(x_i - C_i)^2 = ( x_0 - C_0 )^2 + ( x_1 - C_1 )^2 + ( x_2 - C_2 )^2+ ( x_3 - C_3 )^2 = r^2.$$

The 3-sphere centered at the origin with radius 1 is called the unit 3-sphere and is usually denoted S^{3}:

$$S^3 = \left\{(x_0,x_1,x_2,x_3)\in\mathbb{R}^4 : x_0^2 + x_1^2 + x_2^2 + x_3^2 = 1\right\}.$$

It is often convenient to regard R^{4} as the space with 2 complex dimensions (C^{2}) or the quaternions (H). The unit 3-sphere is then given by

$$S^3 = \left\{(z_1,z_2)\in\mathbb{C}^2 : |z_1|^2 + |z_2|^2 = 1\right\}$$

or

$$S^3 = \left\{q\in\mathbb{H} : \|q\| = 1\right\}.$$

This description as the quaternions of norm one identifies the 3-sphere with the versors in the quaternion division ring. Just as the unit circle is important for planar polar coordinates, so the 3-sphere is important in the polar view of 4-space involved in quaternion multiplication. See polar decomposition of a quaternion for details of this development of the three-sphere. This view of the 3-sphere is the basis for the study of elliptic space as developed by Georges Lemaître.

== Properties ==
=== Elementary properties ===
The 3-dimensional surface volume of a 3-sphere of radius r is

$$SV=2\pi^2 r^3 \,$$

while the 4-dimensional hypervolume (the content of the 4-dimensional region, or ball, bounded by the 3-sphere) is

$$H=\frac{1}{2} \pi^2 r^4.$$

Every non-empty intersection of a 3-sphere with a three-dimensional hyperplane is a 2-sphere (unless the hyperplane is tangent to the 3-sphere, in which case the intersection is a single point). As a 3-sphere moves through a given three-dimensional hyperplane, the intersection starts out as a point, then becomes a growing 2-sphere that reaches its maximal size when the hyperplane cuts right through the "equator" of the 3-sphere. Then the 2-sphere shrinks again down to a single point as the 3-sphere leaves the hyperplane.

In a given three-dimensional hyperplane, a 3-sphere can rotate about an "equatorial plane" (analogous to a 2-sphere rotating about a central axis), in which case it appears to be a 2-sphere whose size is constant.

=== Topological properties ===
A 3-sphere is a compact, connected, 3-dimensional manifold without boundary. It is also simply connected. What this means, in the broad sense, is that any loop, or circular path, on the 3-sphere can be continuously shrunk to a point without leaving the 3-sphere. The Poincaré conjecture, proved in 2003 by Grigori Perelman, provides that the 3-sphere is the only three-dimensional manifold (up to homeomorphism) with these properties.

The 3-sphere is homeomorphic to the one-point compactification of R^{3}. In general, any topological space that is homeomorphic to the 3-sphere is called a topological 3-sphere.

The homology groups of the 3-sphere are as follows: H_{0}(S^{3}, Z) and H_{3}(S^{3}, Z) are both infinite cyclic, while H_{i}(S^{3}, Z) = {0} for all other indices i. Any topological space with these homology groups is known as a homology 3-sphere. Initially Poincaré conjectured that all homology 3-spheres are homeomorphic to S^{3}, but then he himself constructed a non-homeomorphic one, now known as the Poincaré homology sphere. Infinitely many homology spheres are now known to exist. For example, a Dehn filling with slope 1/n on any knot in the 3-sphere gives a homology sphere; typically these are not homeomorphic to the 3-sphere.

As to the homotopy groups, we have π_{1}(S^{3}) = π_{2}(S^{3}) = 0 and π_{3}(S^{3}) is infinite cyclic. The higher-homotopy groups (k ≥ 4) are all finite abelian but otherwise follow no discernible pattern. For more discussion see homotopy groups of spheres.

Homotopy groups of S^{3}
k	0	1	2	3	4	5	6	7	8	9	10	11	12	13	14	15	16
π_{k}(S^{3})	0	0	0	Z	Z_{2}	Z_{2}	Z_{12}	Z_{2}	Z_{2}	Z_{3}	Z_{15}	Z_{2}	Z_{2}⊕Z_{2}	Z_{12}⊕Z_{2}	Z_{84}⊕Z_{2}⊕Z_{2}	Z_{2}⊕Z_{2}	Z_{6}

=== Geometric properties ===
The 3-sphere is naturally a smooth manifold, in fact, a closed embedded submanifold of R^{4}. The Euclidean metric on R^{4} induces a metric on the 3-sphere giving it the structure of a Riemannian manifold. As with all spheres, the 3-sphere has constant positive sectional curvature equal to 1/r^{2} where r is the radius.

Much of the interesting geometry of the 3-sphere stems from the fact that the 3-sphere has a natural Lie group structure given by quaternion multiplication (see the section below on group structure). The only other spheres with such a structure are the 0-sphere and the 1-sphere (see circle group).

Unlike the 2-sphere, the 3-sphere admits nonvanishing vector fields (sections of its tangent bundle). One can even find three linearly independent and nonvanishing vector fields. These may be taken to be any left-invariant vector fields forming a basis for the Lie algebra of the 3-sphere. This implies that the 3-sphere is parallelizable. It follows that the tangent bundle of the 3-sphere is trivial. For a general discussion of the number of linear independent vector fields on a n-sphere, see the article vector fields on spheres.

There is an interesting action of the circle group T on S^{3} giving the 3-sphere the structure of a principal circle bundle known as the Hopf bundle. If one thinks of S^{3} as a subset of C^{2}, the action is given by

$$(z_1,z_2)\cdot\lambda = (z_1\lambda,z_2\lambda)\quad \forall\lambda\in\mathbb T$$.

The orbit space of this action is homeomorphic to the two-sphere S^{2}. Since S^{3} is not homeomorphic to S^{2} × S^{1}, the Hopf bundle is nontrivial.

== Topological construction ==
There are several well-known constructions of the three-sphere. Here we describe gluing a pair of three-balls and then the one-point compactification.

=== Gluing ===
A 3-sphere can be constructed topologically by "gluing" together the boundaries of a pair of 3-balls. The boundary of a 3-ball is a 2-sphere, and these two 2-spheres are to be identified. That is, imagine a pair of 3-balls of the same size, then superpose them so that their 2-spherical boundaries match, and let matching pairs of points on the pair of 2-spheres be identically equivalent to each other. In analogy with the case of the 2-sphere (see below), the gluing surface is called an equatorial sphere.

Note that the interiors of the 3-balls are not glued to each other. One way to think of the fourth dimension is as a continuous real-valued function of the 3-dimensional coordinates of the 3-ball, perhaps considered to be "temperature". We take the "temperature" to be zero along the gluing 2-sphere and let one of the 3-balls be "hot" and let the other 3-ball be "cold". The "hot" 3-ball could be thought of as the "upper hemisphere" and the "cold" 3-ball could be thought of as the "lower hemisphere". The temperature is highest/lowest at the centers of the two 3-balls.

This construction is analogous to a construction of a 2-sphere, performed by gluing the boundaries of a pair of disks. A disk is a 2-ball, and the boundary of a disk is a circle (a 1-sphere). Let a pair of disks be of the same diameter. Superpose them and glue corresponding points on their boundaries. Again one may think of the third dimension as temperature. Likewise, we may inflate the 2-sphere, moving the pair of disks to become the northern and southern hemispheres.

=== One-point compactification ===
After removing a single point from the 2-sphere, what remains is homeomorphic to the Euclidean plane. In the same way, removing a single point from the 3-sphere yields three-dimensional space. An extremely useful way to see this is via stereographic projection. We first describe the lower-dimensional version.

Rest the south pole of a unit 2-sphere on the xy-plane in three-space. We map a point P of the sphere (minus the north pole N) to the plane by sending P to the intersection of the line NP with the plane. Stereographic projection of a 3-sphere (again removing the north pole) maps to three-space in the same manner. (Notice that, since stereographic projection is conformal, round spheres are sent to round spheres or to planes.)

A somewhat different way to think of the one-point compactification is via the exponential map. Returning to our picture of the unit two-sphere sitting on the Euclidean plane: Consider a geodesic in the plane, based at the origin, and map this to a geodesic in the two-sphere of the same length, based at the south pole. Under this map all points of the circle of radius π are sent to the north pole. Since the open unit disk is homeomorphic to the Euclidean plane, this is again a one-point compactification.

The exponential map for 3-sphere is similarly constructed; it may also be discussed using the fact that the 3-sphere is the Lie group of unit quaternions.

== Coordinate systems on the 3-sphere ==
The four Euclidean coordinates for S^{3} are redundant since they are subject to the condition that x_{0}^{2} + x_{1}^{2} + x_{2}^{2} + x_{3}^{2} = 1. As a 3-dimensional manifold one should be able to parameterize S^{3} by three coordinates, just as one can parameterize the 2-sphere using two coordinates (such as latitude and longitude). Due to the nontrivial topology of S^{3} it is impossible to find a single set of coordinates that cover the entire space. Just as on the 2-sphere, one must use at least two coordinate charts. Some different choices of coordinates are given below.

=== Hyperspherical coordinates ===
It is convenient to have some sort of hyperspherical coordinates on S^{3} in analogy to the usual spherical coordinates on S^{2}. One such choice — by no means unique — is to use (ψ, θ, φ), where

$$\begin{align}
x_0 &= r\cos\psi \\
x_1 &= r\sin\psi \cos\theta \\
x_2 &= r\sin\psi \sin\theta \cos \varphi \\
x_3 &= r\sin\psi \sin\theta \sin\varphi \end{align}$$

where ψ and θ run over the range 0 to π, and φ runs over 0 to 2π. Note that, for any fixed value of ψ, θ and φ parameterize a 2-sphere of radius $r\sin\psi$, except for the degenerate cases, when ψ equals 0 or π, in which case they describe a point.

The round metric on the 3-sphere in these coordinates is given by

$$ds^2 = r^2 \left[ d\psi^2 + \sin^2\psi\left(d\theta^2 + \sin^2\theta\, d\varphi^2\right) \right]$$

and the volume form by

$$dV =r^3 \left(\sin^2\psi\,\sin\theta\right)\,d\psi\wedge d\theta\wedge d\varphi.$$

These coordinates have an elegant description in terms of quaternions. Any unit quaternion q can be written as a versor:

$$q = e^{\tau\psi} = \cos\psi + \tau\sin\psi$$

where τ is a unit imaginary quaternion; that is, a quaternion that satisfies τ^{2} = −1. This is the quaternionic analogue of Euler's formula. Now the unit imaginary quaternions all lie on the unit 2-sphere in Im H so any such τ can be written:

$$\tau = (\cos\theta) i + (\sin\theta\cos\varphi) j + (\sin\theta\sin\varphi) k$$

With τ in this form, the unit quaternion q is given by

$$q = e^{\tau\psi} = x_0 + x_1 i + x_2 j + x_3 k$$

where x_{0,1,2,3} are as above.

When q is used to describe spatial rotations (cf. quaternions and spatial rotations), it describes a rotation about τ through an angle of 2ψ.

=== Hopf coordinates ===
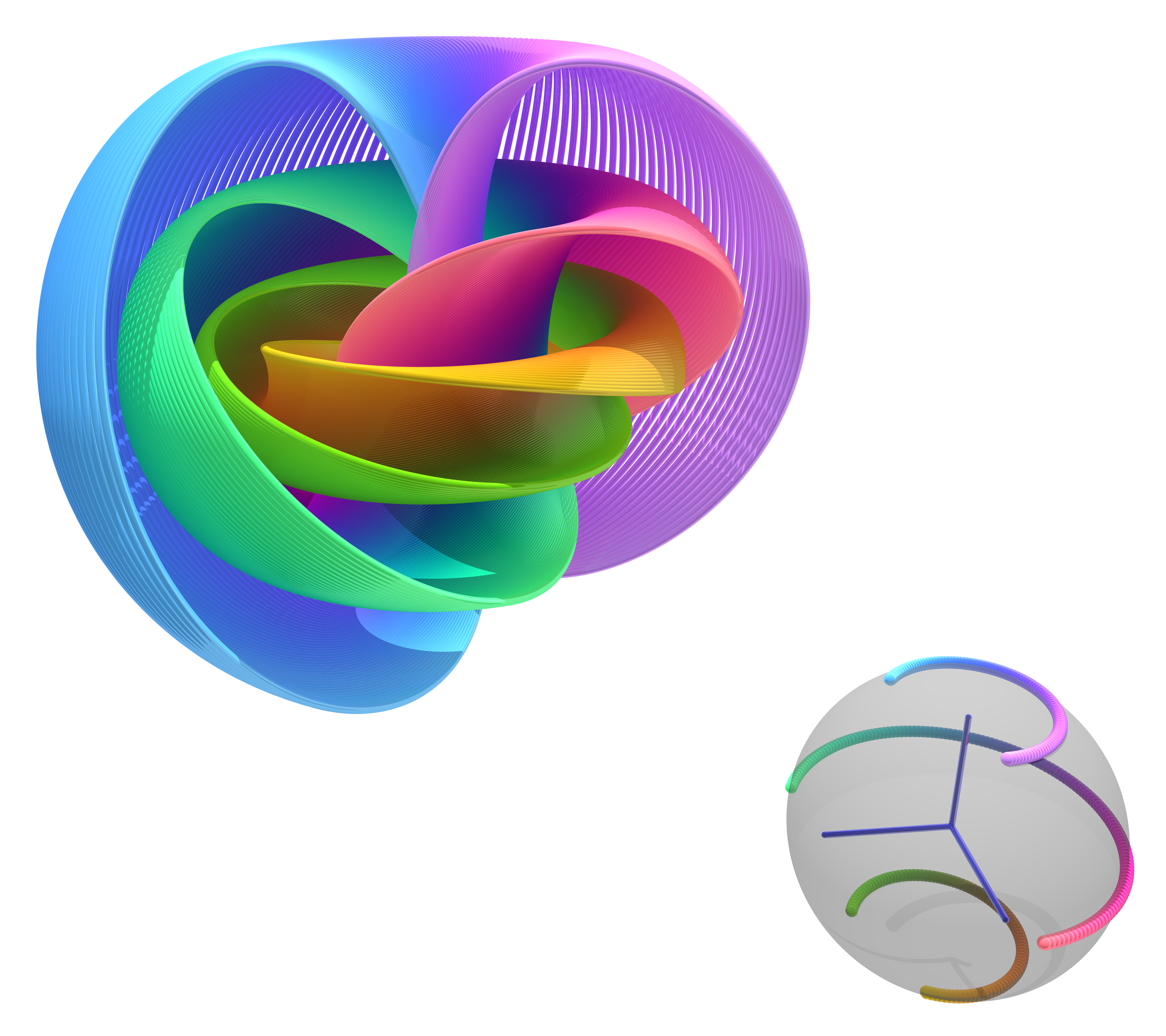
The Hopf fibration can be visualized using a stereographic projection of S^{3} to R^{3} and then compressing R^{3} to a ball. This image shows points on S^{2} and their corresponding fibers with the same color.

For unit radius another choice of hyperspherical coordinates, (η, ξ_{1}, ξ_{2}), makes use of the embedding of S^{3} in C^{2}. In complex coordinates (z_{1}, z_{2}) ∈ C^{2} we write

$$\begin{align}
z_1 &= e^{i\,\xi_1}\sin\eta \\
z_2 &= e^{i\,\xi_2}\cos\eta. \end{align}$$

This could also be expressed in R^{4} as

$$\begin{align}
x_0 &= \cos\xi_1\sin\eta \\
x_1 &= \sin\xi_1\sin\eta \\
x_2 &= \cos\xi_2\cos\eta \\
x_3 &= \sin\xi_2\cos\eta. \end{align}$$

Here η runs over the range 0 to π/2, and ξ_{1} and ξ_{2} can take any values between 0 and 2π. These coordinates are useful in the description of the 3-sphere as the Hopf bundle

$$S^1 \to S^3 \to S^2.\,$$

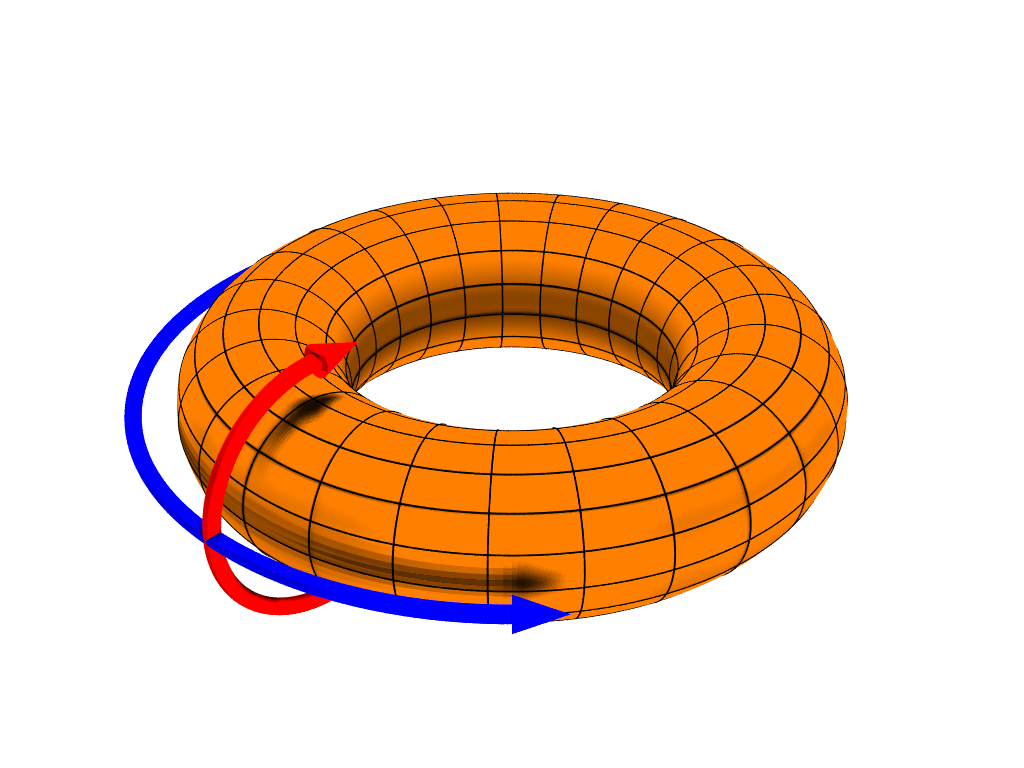
A diagram depicting the poloidal (ξ_{1}) direction, represented by the red arrow, and the toroidal (ξ_{2}) direction, represented by the blue arrow, although the terms poloidal and toroidal are arbitrary in this flat torus case.

For any fixed value of η between 0 and π/2, the coordinates (ξ_{1}, ξ_{2}) parameterize a 2-dimensional torus. Rings of constant ξ_{1} and ξ_{2} above form simple orthogonal grids on the tori. See image to right. In the degenerate cases, when η equals 0 or π/2, these coordinates describe a circle.

The round metric on the 3-sphere in these coordinates is given by

$$ds^2 = d\eta^2 + \sin^2\eta\,d\xi_1^2 + \cos^2\eta\,d\xi_2^2$$

and the volume form by

$$dV = \sin\eta\cos\eta\,d\eta\wedge d\xi_1\wedge d\xi_2.$$

To get the interlocking circles of the Hopf fibration, make a simple substitution in the equations above

$$\begin{align}
z_1 &= e^{i\,(\xi_1+\xi_2)}\sin\eta \\
z_2 &= e^{i\,(\xi_2-\xi_1)}\cos\eta. \end{align}$$

In this case η, and ξ_{1} specify which circle, and ξ_{2} specifies the position along each circle. One round trip (0 to 2π) of ξ_{1} or ξ_{2} equates to a round trip of the torus in the 2 respective directions.

=== Stereographic coordinates ===
Another convenient set of coordinates can be obtained via stereographic projection of S^{3} from a pole onto the corresponding equatorial R^{3} hyperplane. For example, if we project from the point (−1, 0, 0, 0) we can write a point p in S^{3} as

$$p = \left(\frac{1-\|u\|^2}{1+\|u\|^2}, \frac{2\mathbf{u}}{1+\|u\|^2}\right) = \frac{1+\mathbf{u}}{1-\mathbf{u}}$$

where u = (u_{1}, u_{2}, u_{3}) is a vector in R^{3} and ‖u‖^{2} = u_{1}^{2} + u_{2}^{2} + u_{3}^{2}. In the second equality above, we have identified p with a unit quaternion and u = u_{1}i + u_{2}j + u_{3}k with a pure quaternion. (Note that the numerator and denominator commute here even though quaternionic multiplication is generally noncommutative). The inverse of this map takes p = (x_{0}, x_{1}, x_{2}, x_{3}) in S^{3} to

$$\mathbf{u} = \frac{1}{1+x_0}\left(x_1, x_2, x_3\right).$$

We could just as well have projected from the point (1, 0, 0, 0), in which case the point p is given by

$$p = \left(\frac{-1+\|v\|^2}{1+\|v\|^2}, \frac{2\mathbf{v}}{1+\|v\|^2}\right) = \frac{-1+\mathbf{v}}{1+\mathbf{v}}$$

where v = (v_{1}, v_{2}, v_{3}) is another vector in R^{3}. The inverse of this map takes p to

$$\mathbf{v} = \frac{1}{1-x_0}\left(x_1,x_2,x_3\right).$$

Note that the u coordinates are defined everywhere but (−1, 0, 0, 0) and the v coordinates everywhere but (1, 0, 0, 0). This defines an atlas on S^{3} consisting of two coordinate charts or "patches", which together cover all of S^{3}. Note that the transition function between these two charts on their overlap is given by

$$\mathbf{v} = \frac{1}{\|u\|^2}\mathbf{u}$$

and vice versa.

== Group structure ==
When considered as the set of unit quaternions, S^{3} inherits an important structure, namely that of quaternionic multiplication. Because the set of unit quaternions is closed under multiplication, S^{3} takes on the structure of a group. Moreover, since quaternionic multiplication is smooth, S^{3} can be regarded as a real Lie group. It is a nonabelian, compact Lie group of dimension 3. When thought of as a Lie group, S^{3} is often denoted Sp(1) or U(1, H).

It turns out that the only spheres that admit a Lie group structure are S^{1}, thought of as the set of unit complex numbers, and S^{3}, the set of unit quaternions (The degenerate case S^{0} which consists of the real numbers 1 and −1 is also a Lie group, albeit a 0-dimensional one). One might think that S^{7}, the set of unit octonions, would form a Lie group, but this fails since octonion multiplication is nonassociative. The octonionic structure does give S^{7} one important property: parallelizability. It turns out that the only spheres that are parallelizable are S^{0}, S^{1}, S^{3}, and S^{7}.

By using a matrix representation of the quaternions, H, one obtains a matrix representation of S^{3}. One convenient choice is given by the Pauli matrices:

$$x_1+ x_2 i + x_3 j + x_4 k \mapsto \begin{pmatrix}\;\;\,x_1 + i x_2 & x_3 + i x_4 \\ -x_3 + i x_4 & x_1 - i x_2\end{pmatrix}.$$

This map gives an injective algebra homomorphism from H to the set of 2 × 2 complex matrices. It has the property that the absolute value of a quaternion q is equal to the square root of the determinant of the matrix image of q.

The set of unit quaternions is then given by matrices of the above form with unit determinant. This matrix subgroup is precisely the special unitary group SU(2). Thus, S^{3} as a Lie group is isomorphic to SU(2).

Using our Hopf coordinates (η, ξ_{1}, ξ_{2}) we can then write any element of SU(2) in the form

$$\begin{pmatrix}
e^{i\,\xi_1}\sin\eta & e^{i\,\xi_2}\cos\eta \\
-e^{-i\,\xi_2}\cos\eta & e^{-i\,\xi_1}\sin\eta
\end{pmatrix}.$$

Another way to state this result is if we express the matrix representation of an element of SU(2) as an exponential of a linear combination of the Pauli matrices. It is seen that an arbitrary element U ∈ SU(2) can be written as

$U=\exp \left( \sum_{i=1}^3\alpha_i J_i\right).$

The condition that the determinant of U is +1 implies that the coefficients α_{1} are constrained to lie on a 3-sphere.

== In literature ==
In Edwin Abbott Abbott's Flatland, published in 1884, and in Sphereland, a 1965 sequel to Flatland by Dionys Burger, the 3-sphere is referred to as an oversphere, and a 4-sphere is referred to as a hypersphere.

Writing in the American Journal of Physics, Mark A. Peterson describes three different ways of visualizing 3-spheres and points out language in The Divine Comedy that suggests Dante viewed the Universe in the same way; Carlo Rovelli supports the same idea.

In Art Meets Mathematics in the Fourth Dimension, Stephen L. Lipscomb develops the concept of the hypersphere dimensions as it relates to art, architecture, and mathematics.

== See also ==
- 1-sphere, 2-sphere, n-sphere
- tesseract, polychoron, simplex
- Pauli matrices
- Hopf bundle, Riemann sphere
- Poincaré sphere
- Reeb foliation
- Clifford torus
