= The Planiverse =

1984 novel by A. K. Dewdney

- Author: A. K. Dewdney
- Language: English
- Genre: Science fiction
- Publication date: 1984
- ISBN: 0-387-98916-1

The Planiverse is a novel by A. K. Dewdney, written in 1984 about a two-dimensional world.

== Plot ==
In the spirit of Edwin Abbott Abbott's Flatland, Dewdney and his computer science students simulate a two-dimensional world with a complex ecosystem. To their surprise, they find their artificial 2D universe has somehow accidentally become a means of communication with an actual 2D world: Arde. They make a sort of "telepathic" contact with "YNDRD", referred to by the students as Yendred, a highly philosophical Ardean, as he begins a journey across the western half, Punizla, of the single continent Ajem Kollosh to learn more about the spiritual beliefs of the people of the East, Vanizla. Yendred mistakes Dewdney's class for "spirits" and takes great interest in communicating with them. The students and narrator communicate with Yendred by typing on the keyboard; Yendred's answers appear on the computer's printout. The name Yendred (or "Yendwed", as pronounced by one of the students, who has a speech impediment) is simply "Dewdney" reversed.

Written as a travelogue, Yendred's journey through the West takes him through several cities. He visits the Punizlan Institute for Technology and Science, where Arde's technology is explored in great detail. For example, all houses are underground, so as not to be demolished by the periodic 2D rivers; nails are useless for attaching two objects, so tape and glue are used instead; most Ardean creatures cannot have deuterostomic digestive tracts since they would split into two; even games such as Go have one-dimensional analogues such as Alak. An appendix explains various other aspects of two-dimensional science and technology which could not fit into the main story.

The underlying allegory culminates in Yendred's arrival at the watershed of the continent and the planet's only building above ground, where he at last finds Drabk, an Ardean who professes "knowledge of the Beyond" and teaches Yendred to fly. Yendred finds that it is no longer beneficial to maintain contact with Earth, and contact with Arde is lost.

== Development ==
In 1977, Dewdney was inspired by an allegory of a two-dimensional universe, and decided to expand upon the physics and chemistry of such a universe. He published a short monograph in 1979 called Two-Dimensional Science and Technology. This was reviewed by Martin Gardner in his July 1980 "Mathematical Games" column in Scientific American, and shortly after this, all copies of the monograph were sold out. In 1981, following the success of the monograph, Dewdney published A Symposium on Two-Dimensional Science and Technology, which contained suggestions for how a two-dimensional universe would work from scientists and non-scientists on varied subjects. Dewdney wrote The Planiverse as a frame story in which to display the scientific and technical features from these previous works, as well as an allegory for his search for a reality deeper than that of scientific enquiry, and his subsequent conversion to Sufiism.

== Reception ==
Dave Langford reviewed The Planiverse for White Dwarf #55, and stated that "This delightful book will be inspiring 2D game scenarios any second now."

Kirkus Reviews considered it "an ingenious intellectual exercise—amusing, edifying, sometimes tedious". At Tor.com, Jason Shiga found it to be a "tour de force followup" to Flatland, and found the appendix to be the "most impressive section" of the book.

== See also ==
- Creatures (inspired by The Planiverse)
- Flatland - 1884 satirical novella by Edwin Abbott Abbott.
- Flatterland - 2001 book by Ian Stewart, a sequel to Flatland.
- Spaceland
- Sphereland
