= Mirror-image life =

Hypothetical life with reversed molecular chirality

Amino acids are one of the basic building blocks of life. All proteinogenic amino acids are L-α-amino acids. A hypothetical mirror-image life would use their enantiomers, D-α-amino acids, instead. Note that some D-α-amino acids play a role in both prokaryotes and eukaryotes as well.

Mirror-image life (also called mirror life) is a hypothetical form of life using mirror-reflected molecular building blocks.

The successful creation of mirror-image life had previously been the goal of some scientists as a scientific achievement and a potential tool for biomanufacturing of mirror-image molecules. In 2024, a team of 38 scientists, including two Nobel laureates and several researchers previously involved in developing mirror-image life, published a report suggesting that mirror-image life could pose catastrophic risks to health and the environment. Unlike simple mirror-image molecules, mirror-image organisms such as bacteria could reproduce and might irreversibly spread through ecosystems. Such bacteria might be able to evade many components of immune systems, causing fatal infections in humans, animals, and plants. Some scientists, bioethicists, policymakers, and civil society groups have recommended that governance be established to ensure that mirror-image life is not created, and some funders have refused to support research with the goal of creating mirror-image life. Discussions are ongoing about the risks of mirror life and appropriate governance.

Certain mirror-image components of molecular machinery have been synthesized in laboratories and efforts to chemically synthesize a mirror-image ribosome have been ongoing since 2016. Although entire mirror organisms could in principle be created, some scientists estimate 10 to 30 years before the creation of mirror-image life is possible.

== Concept ==
=== Homochirality ===
Life uses D-ribose (left), here shown using Fischer projection, as the building block of RNA.

Many of the essential molecules for life on Earth can exist in two mirror-image forms, often called "left-handed" and "right-handed", but living organisms do not use both. (Handedness refers to the direction in which polarized light skews when beamed through a pure solution of the molecule.) RNA and DNA contain only right-handed sugars; proteins made by the ribosome (Note: Many bacteria and fungi synthesise nonribosomal peptides containing right-handed amino acids, as the example of peptidoglycan synthesis shows.) are exclusively composed of left-handed amino acids. This phenomenon is known as homochirality. It is not known whether homochirality emerged before or after life, whether the building blocks of life must have this particular chirality, or indeed whether life needs to be homochiral. Protein chains built from amino acids of mixed chirality tend not to fold or function well, but mirror-image proteins have been constructed that have identical function but on substrates of opposite handedness.

=== Possibility of mirror-image life ===
The possibility of mirror-image life has been discussed since Louis Pasteur's 1860 work on molecular asymmetry.

Advances in organic chemistry and synthetic biology may, in the future, lead to the possibility of fully synthesizing a living cell from small molecules, which could enable synthesizing mirror-image cells from mirrored versions (enantiomers) of life's building-block molecules. Some important proteins in the central dogma of molecular biology have been synthesized in mirror-image versions, including DNA polymerase in 2016 and RNA polymerase in 2022.

Reconstructing regular lifeforms in mirror-image form, using the mirror-image (chiral) reflection of their cellular components, could be achieved by substituting left-handed amino acids with right-handed ones, in order to create mirror reflections of proteins, and likewise substituting right-handed with left-handed nucleic acids. Because the phospholipids of cell membranes are also chiral, American geneticist George Church proposed using an achiral fatty acid instead of mirror-image phospholipids for the membrane. (Note: An achiral version of phospholipids is not strictly required, as both chiralities of phospholipids are already used in the cell membrane of existing life forms: eukaryotes and bacteria use one chirality (G3P) while archaea use the other (G1P). The two have even been mixed using genetic engineering, producing viable modified E. coli. Genetic evidence for a natural mixed-membrane system have also been found, pending definitive proof by chemical analysis.)

Electromagnetism, the dominant interaction in chemistry, is unchanged under mirror-image transformation (P-symmetry). There is a small alteration of weak interactions under reflection, which can produce very small corrections that theoretically favor the natural enantiomers of amino acids and sugars, but it is unknown if this effect is large enough to affect the functionality of mirror-image biomolecules or explain homochirality in nature.

== Potential risks ==
In December 2024, 38 scientists, including several synthetic biology researchers and two Nobel laureates, warned that the creation of mirror-image life could cause "unprecedented and irreversible harm" to human health and ecosystems worldwide. The reversed structure of mirror-image bacteria could allow them to evade many mechanisms critical for immunity and predation that have evolved to recognize natural-chirality structures. As a result, mirror-image bacteria could potentially escape immune defenses and invade natural ecosystems, leading to "pervasive lethal infections in a substantial fraction of plant and animal species, including humans." Given these risks, the scientists concluded that mirror-image organisms should not be created without compelling evidence of safety. As of January 2026, no researchers are known to be pursuing the creation of mirror life; several who had been pursuing it have since renounced it and signed on as coauthors on the 2024 paper.

Since the publication of the 2024 paper, 96 biotechnology experts signed a statement agreeing with its conclusions, and attendees of the first international conference on mirror-image life largely agreed that it should not be created. Germany’s Central Commission for Biological Safety (ZKBS) issued a statement that while applied research on mirror biomolecules should continue, mirror bacteria could pose serious risks, and that "a broad scientific and societal debate" was necessary. The UNESCO International Bioethics Committee recommended a precautionary global moratorium on the creation of mirror-image organisms, and the UK Government Office for Science held an expert roundtable that recommended "prevent[ing] the development of replicating mirror organisms." Several philanthropic funders have also stated that they will not fund research with the goal of creating mirror-image organisms, including Renaissance Philanthropy. In 2026, the UN Scientific Advisory Board called for "proactive multilateral action, such as a dedicated global forum, to define clear 'red lines', strengthen safety and monitoring practices, and establish responsible policy well before mirror life becomes feasible", and Chinese and US policy research organizations issued a joint statement calling for "national and international frameworks to guard against the risks posed by mirror life, reaffirming the shared view that such organisms should never be created."

Some scientists and scholars have argued that concerns about mirror-image life are theoretical and/or that bans on research and funding bans are premature. Others have argued that the immune system might be able to recognize mirror versions of a certain type of biomolecule. Some scientists have proposed developing guidelines for synthetic biological entities regardless of their chirality.

== Potential applications ==
The primary proposed benefit of creating mirror-image organisms is as a means to mass-produce mirror-image forms of molecules that are produced by normal life. Mirror-image molecules have been studied for several decades and may offer a range of potential applications. There is broad agreement among scientists that it is important to distinguish between mirror-image molecules and whole mirror-image organisms. Some scientists argue that chemical synthesis methods are sufficient for creating mirror-image molecules without posing the potentially catastrophic risks of mirror-image organisms.

Potential applications of mirror-image molecules include:

- Enantiopure drugs: Some pharmaceuticals show different activity depending on enantiomeric form.
- L-ribonucleic acid aptamers: Artificial oligonucleotides that are constructed from the mirror-image versions of their natural forms. L-RNA aptamers are highly resistant to degradation by nucleases and are currently being tested in clinical trials.
- L-glucose, enantiomer of standard glucose: Tests showed that it tastes likes standard sugar, but is not metabolized the same way. However, it was never marketed due to excessive manufacturing costs. More recent research allows cheap production with high yields; however the authors state that it is not usable as a sweetener due to laxative effects.

== In fiction ==
The creation of a mirror-image human is the basis of the 1950 short story "Technical Error" by Arthur C. Clarke. In this story, a physical accident transforms a person into his mirror image, speculatively explained by travel through a fourth physical dimension. H. G. Wells' The Plattner Story (1896) is based on a similar idea.

In the 1970 Star Trek novel Spock Must Die! by James Blish, the science officer of the USS Enterprise is replicated in mirror-image form by a transporter mishap. He locks himself in the sick bay where he is able to synthesize mirror-image forms of basic nutrients needed for his survival.

An alien machine that reverses chirality, and a blood-symbiont that functions properly only when in one chirality, were central to Roger Zelazny's 1976 novel Doorways in the Sand.

On the titular planet of Sheri S. Tepper's 1989 novel Grass, some lifeforms have evolved to use the right-handed isomer of alanine.

In the Mass Effect series, chirality of amino acids in foodstuffs is discussed often in both dialogue and encyclopedia files.

In the 2014 science fiction novel Cibola Burn by James S. A. Corey, the planet Ilus has indigenous life with partially-mirrored chirality. This renders human colonists unable to digest native flora and fauna, and greatly complicates conventional farming. Consequently, the colonists have to rely upon hydroponic farming and food importation.

In the 2017 Daniel Suarez novel Change Agent, an antagonist, Otto, nicknamed the "Mirror Man", is revealed to be a genetically engineered mirror-image human. Serving as an assassin due to his complete immunity to neurotoxins, which he coats himself with in the form of a cologne-like aerosol, he views other humans with disdain and causes them to feel an inexplicable repulsion by his very presence.

The concept is used during Ryan North's 2023 run on Fantastic Four as an existential threat towards the human population.

== See also ==
- D-peptide – Class of amino acids
- Mirror matter – A hypothetical form of matter that interacts only weakly with normal matter, which could form mirror planets, potentially inhabited by mirror-matter life
- Shadow biosphere – Hypothetical biosphere of Earth
- Xenobiology – Science of synthetic life forms
