= Sphere-world =

Mathematical thought experiment posed by Henri Poincaré

The idea of a sphere-world was constructed by French mathematician Henri Poincaré who, while pursuing his argument for conventionalism (see philosophy of space and time), offered a thought experiment about a sphere with strange properties.

== The concept ==
Poincaré asks us to imagine a sphere of radius R. The temperature of the sphere decreases from its maximum at the center to absolute zero at its extremity such that a body’s temperature at a distance r from the center is proportional to $R^2-r^2$.

In addition, all bodies have the same coefficient of dilatation so every body shrinks and expands in similar proportion as they move about the sphere. To finish the story, Poincaré states that the index of refraction will also vary with the distance r, in inverse proportion to $R^2-r^2$.

How will this world look to inhabitants of this sphere?

In many ways it will look normal. Bodies will remain intact upon transfer from place to place, as well as seeming to remain the same size (the Spherians would shrink along with them). The geometry, on the other hand, would seem quite different. Supposing the inhabitants were to view rods believed to be rigid, or measure distance with light rays. They would find that a geodesic is not a straight line, and that the ratio of a circle’s circumference to its radius is greater than $2\pi$.

These inhabitants would in fact determine that their universe is not ruled by Euclidean geometry, but instead by hyperbolic geometry.

== Commentary ==
This thought experiment is discussed in Roberto Torretti's book Philosophy of Geometry from Riemann to Poincaré and in Jeremy Gray's article "Epistemology of Geometry" in the Stanford Encyclopedia of Philosophy. This sphere-world is also described in Ian Stewart's book Flatterland (chapter 10, Platterland).

== See also ==
- Flatland
