= Flatland (2007 Johnson and Travis film) =

Flatland: The Movie
- Directed by: Dano Johnson; Jeffrey Travis
- Screenplay by: Seth Caplan; Dano Johnson; Jeffrey Travis
- Based on: Edwin A. Abbott's; Flatland: A Romance of Many Dimensions
- Produced by: Seth Caplan; Will Wallace
- Starring: Kristen Bell; Tony Hale; Martin Sheen; Michael York
- Music by: Kaz Boyle
- Distributed by: Flat World Productions
- Release dates: 2007 (DVD); 2011 (IMAX 3D)
- Running time: 34 minutes
- Country: United States
- Language: English

Flatland: The Movie is a 2007 American animated science fiction short film directed by Dano Johnson and Jeffrey Travis. The cast includes the voices of actors Martin Sheen, Kristen Bell and Tony Hale. The story is based on the 1884 science fiction novella Flatland: A Romance of Many Dimensions written by Edwin A. Abbott.

== Plot ==
The two-dimensional Arthur Square awakens from a dream of strange, glowing symbols. He lives with his wife, Arlene Square, and his curious granddaughter Hex, a hexagon. Hex and Arthur discuss the laws of inheritance: how each new generation of Flatlanders, beginning with triangles, gains a new side until the shapes become indistinguishable from circles. They also discuss how a citizen's shape affects their job, with triangles performing menial labor and circles ruling Flatland in the priest class. They witness a cruel incident where a Circle Priest arrests a slightly irregular octagon child, prompting Hex to yet again wonder what happened to her pentagonal parents. Arthur tells her that he will tell her someday.

The head circle ruler of Flatland, Pantocyclus, issues a new edict that bans discussion of heretical topics such as a third dimension or the ruins at Area 33H. Arthur recognizes an image of the ruins from his dream.

Arthur gives Hex a geometry lesson, showing how powers in arithmetic can be translated to geometrical dimensions. When Hex speculates on a third dimension, Arthur becomes infuriated and sends her to her room. To calm Hex, Arlene gives her her mother's box containing books and a model of the symbols at Area 33H.

That night, Arthur Square is taken to a strange landscape. He encounters the insane King of Pointland, a being of zero dimensions. Then he encounters Lineland, a universe of one dimension that is populated by an arrogant line segment King who cannot imagine a new dimension that he cannot see. Finally, Arthur is whisked back to his living room. He hears a voice booming out and sees a point grow to a circle and then back to a point. The being identifies himself as Spherius, a three-dimensional solid from Spaceland. After Spherius fails to explain the third dimension, Arthur is popped into Spaceland. They stop at Area 33H and Arthur realizes that the symbols show a progression from point to line to square to cube, and that the constantly changing shape in the center is actually a cube, halfway through the plane of Flatland and spinning along all three axes. Arthur asks Spherius to show him the fourth dimension and the fifth dimension, but Spherius says there couldn't possibly be a higher dimension. He tells Arthur to spread the word of the third dimension and drops Arthur back into bed. Meanwhile, at the Ministry, Pantocyclus is ordering the triangle-guards and circles, including Miss Helios (Arthur's boss), to beware any employees who mention the third dimension and to guard Area 33H.

Hex leaves to explore Area 33H, but a triangle guard spots her. At the Ministry, Arthur is talking to his brother, when an alarm goes off. Over the intercom, Miss Helios orders all guards to catch an intruder at Area 33H. Arthur realizes it might be Hex and persuades Abbott (his brother) to help him steal a Ministry car.

Abbott and Arthur arrive at the ruins moments before the triangle guards. With Abbott distracting the guards, Arthur goes to the symbols and finds Hex terrified. Arthur admits to her that her parents were arrested and killed for their theories about the third dimension. With the guards closing in, Arthur pushes Hex into the cube symbol, which pops her up into the third dimension. Arthur is arrested by Miss Helios.

Arthur is hastily brought into a courtroom with Pantocyclus proceeding over his trial for heresy. Arlene arrives and asks where Hex is. In his cell, Arthur assures her that Hex escaped 'upward' into the third dimension and is safe. A nearby pentagon begins broadcasting the trial. Pantocyclus challenges Arthur to show everyone the third dimension. Arthur admits that he can't, but pleads to his fellow Flatlanders that reason dictates a third dimension. He challenges them to aspire to be greater than their shapes, angering the Circles immensely. In a fit of rage, Pantocyclus sentences Arthur to death, but Spherius suddenly pops Arthur out of Flatland.

Arthur thanks Spherius but feels he has failed to persuade people of the third dimension. Spherius tells Arthur that he intended Hex, not Arthur, to be the prophet of the Third Dimension. Hex embraces Arthur and they fly back down to the courtroom, surprising everyone as they materialize out of nowhere. The Circles are speechless and lose control of the courtroom, evading the reporter's questions about the third dimension. Arthur, Arlene, Hex, and Abbott are reunited. The reporter asks Hex if she has also visited the fourth dimension. Spherius angrily comes down to Flatland to scoff at the idea and flies off.

The symbols at Area 33H are glowing and as the camera dips below Flatland we see that the spinning cube is actually part of a larger installation: eight cubes spinning and orbiting a 4D cube – a tesseract – which, in turn, is rotating around its fourth axis.

== Cast ==
- Kristen Bell as Hex
- Lee Eddy as Helios
- Joe Estevez as Abbott Square
- Tony Hale as King of Pointland
- Curtis Luciani as King of Lineland
- Shannon McCormick as Triangle Guard
- T. Lynn Mikeska as Heptagon Mother
- Robert Murphy as Pentagon Reporter
- Garry Peters as Pantocyclus
- Martin Sheen as Arthur Square
- Danu Uribe as Arlene Square
- Michael York as Spherius

== Reception ==
The film received positive reviews from mathematics publications. Hemant Mehta of the Skeptical Inquirer wrote, "While other film versions of Flatland have been made in the past, none have the visual appeal and star power this one has," and went on to add that the film "should be required viewing for any twenty-first century math teacher." Scientific American's Michelle Press said that "the movie (necessarily) oversimplifies the story. It provides inspiration to read the novel rather than replacement for it—and delight for Flatland fans of all ages.", which is a sentiment shared by Suzanne Caulk of the Mathematical Association of America: "The length is just right — long enough to give you the whole story and short enough to keep it from becoming tiresome. Even though it is very visual and appears to be about geometry, it maintains the satire of the original book." Ian Stewart, writing for the American Mathematical Society, said that "the main objective is to have fun playing around with the dimensional analogy, and I’d say the animation does that very well indeed." He added that "the graphics, with their Mandelbrot-ish decorations, are wonderful, and so is the soundtrack music." "The story also receives a welcome gender facelift," wrote Marianne Freiberger in Plus Magazine; "women are not degenerate line segments, who have to emit warning wails lest they poke someone in the eye with their sharp end, but fully-fledged polygons."

Producer Seth Caplan revealed that Flatland was more profitable than other projects he'd worked on, despite the fact that it was self-distributed online through digital sales and DVD.

== Sequel ==
In 2012 a sequel, Flatland 2: Sphereland, was released. It was based on the 1965 novel Sphereland by Dionys Burger, written as a sequel to Flatland. Kristen Bell, Michael York, and Tony Hale return, along with Danny Pudi, Danica McKellar, and Kate Mulgrew.

== Awards ==
- Winner of Best Animated Film, EcoVision Film Festival, Italy 2009
- Winner of Berlin Special Jury Award, MathFilm Festival 2008
- Runner Up for Best Independent Short Ages 5–12, Kids First! Film Festival 2008

== See also ==
- Flatland, another film based on the book, released in the same year, directed and animated by Ladd Ehlinger Jr.
