= Steve Tomasula =

American novelist

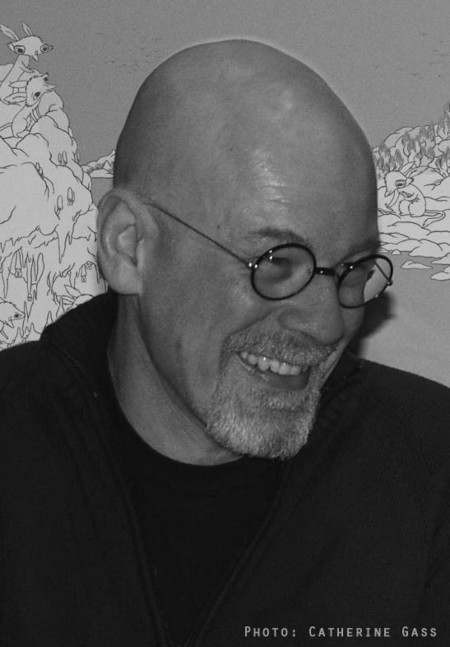
- Tomasula in 2006
- Occupations: Author, academic
- Spouse: Maria C. Tomasula
- Writing career
- Period: Contemporary
- Genres: Novel, short story, criticism
- Website: www.stevetomasula.com

Steve Tomasula is an American novelist, critic, short story, and essay author known for cross-genre narratives that explore conceptions of the self, especially as shaped by language and technology.

== Biography ==
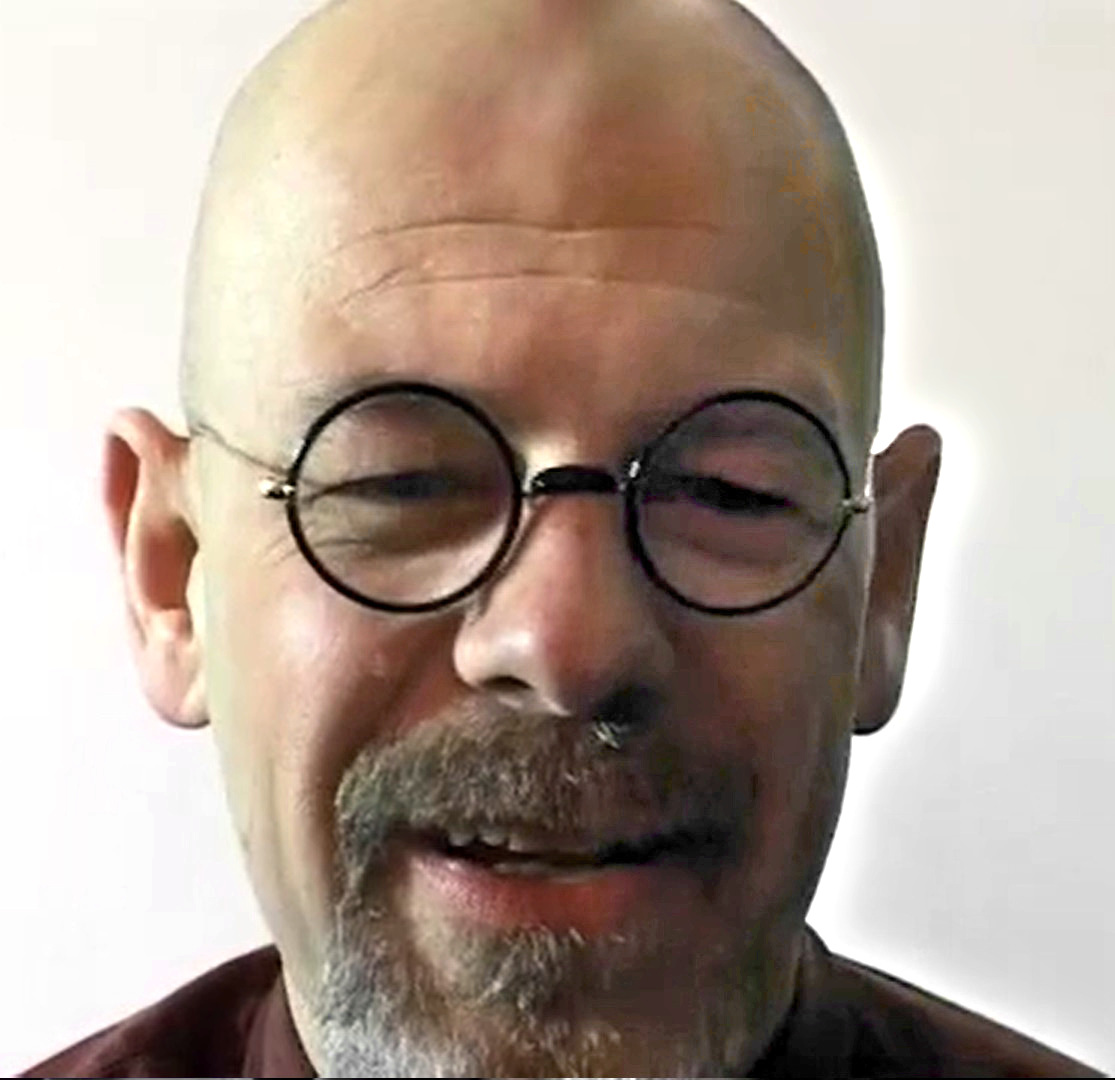
Steve Tomasula in Speaking Portraits

Steve Tomasula grew up along the industrial border between East Chicago and the South Side of Chicago, the locale used as the setting in his novel IN&OZ. He received his M.A. and Ph.D. in English from the University of Illinois, Chicago. While working on his first novel, he taught in the Middle East. After his return, he joined the faculty at the University of Notre Dame, where he is currently a professor of English. Tomasula lives with his wife, the artist Maria Tomasula, in South Bend, Indiana, and Chicago.

== Works ==
Tomasula is the author of five novels, a collection of short fiction, and numerous essays and short stories. His fiction is a hybrid of multiple genres (experimental literature, historical fiction, science writing, poetry) and is noted for its use of visual elements and nonfiction narratives. His writing can be characterized as postmodern and has been called a "reinvention of the novel" for its formal inventiveness, play with language, and incorporation of visual imagery. Though he is mostly known for his novels, his short fiction and essays also take up similar themes, especially the depiction of the self as a construction of society.

His first novel, VAS: An Opera in Flatland (with design by Stephen Farrell) is an adaptation of Edwin Abbott's 1884 novel Flatland: A Romance of Many Dimensions. It uses Abbott's characters Square and Circle and the flat, two-dimensional world in which they live to critique contemporary society during the rise of genetic engineering and other body manipulations. His second novel, The Book of Portraiture (with design by Robert Sedlack) is a prequel to VAS. It tells the story of "portraiture" in chapters that move across several centuries, for example: a desert nomad inventing an alphabet to depict himself in words; a Renaissance painter depicting nobility; and a 20th-century security expert using surveillance cameras and data-mining techniques to compose portraits of employees. TOC: A New-Media Novel is a multimedia novel published on DVD then as an iPad app with a third edition as a web novel (all with design by Stephen Farrell, programming by Christian Jara, and contributions from 15 other artists, composers, musicians, and animators). A collage of text, animation, music, and other art forms, TOC explores competing conceptions of time that shape human lives: historical time, cosmic time, geological time, personal and biological time. IN&OZ is an allegory of four artists (a designer, poet, composer, and photographer) and an auto mechanic. It has been compared to George Orwell's Animal Farm for its class-consciousness as it follows the story of people trying to find a way to live authentically in a world where individuality is squeezed out by mass-market thought. Ascension: A Novel takes up the theme of how humans continually remake the conception of nature, and how these new conceptions shape what it means to be human.

Tomasula's short fiction and essays have been included in many literary magazines, including McSweeney's, Bomb, and The Iowa Review. A collection of his short fiction, Once Human: Stories (Fc2, 2013; with design by Robert Sedlack and others), gathers a number of stories that are thematically linked by conceptions of the self as it is shaped by science, technology, and cultural change.

His essays on innovative and conceptual literature, body art and genetic art have appeared in journals such as The Review of Contemporary Fiction, The New Art Examiner and Leonardo. Critical volumes in which his essays have been published include The Routledge Companion to Experimental Literature (Routledge, 2012); Data Made Flesh: Embodying Information (Routledge, 2012), and Musing the Mosaic (SUNY Press, 2003).

He has given key-note addresses or invited readings from his fiction at numerous universities and institutions, including the Library of Congress in the U.S., and, in Europe, Université Paris 8 (France), Plymouth University (England), Paris Sorbonne University (France), and the University of Constantine the Philosopher (Slovakia).

== Critical reception ==
The American Book Review described VAS: An Opera in Flatland as "a leap forward for the genre we call 'novel.'" Also in the American Book Review, the literary historian Steven Moore wrote that The Book of Portraiture is "brilliant.... The overarching theme of representation and self-portraiture, from cave art to computer code, gives this novel a historical sweep that is breathtaking." Bookforum described it as "a grand historical account," explaining that The Book of Portraiture "reimagines what the novel, particularly the historical novel, might mean in the digital world, and it does so with verve, gusto, and style." TOC: A New-Media Novel received a gold medal, Best Book of the Year in the eLit Awards, and the Mary Shelley Award for Excellence in Fiction and was described in The Huffington Post as a "brilliant time machine." Tomasula's short fiction was awarded the Iowa Prize for most distinguished work published in any genre; it was also published in the 2005 HarperCollins anthology of Year's Best SF and other anthologies. Tomasula's novels are the subject of numerous scholarly and critical conference panels, essays and books, including The Body of Writing: An Erotics of Contemporary American Fiction by Flore Chevaillier, How We Think: Digital Media and Contemporary Technogenesis by N. Katherine Hayles, Out of Mind: Mode, Mediation, and Cognition in Twenty-First-Century Narrative by Torsa Ghosal, The Moral Worlds of Contemporary Realism by Mary K. Holland, Collage in Twenty-First-Century Literature in English: Art of Crisis by Wojciech Drąg, and Steve Tomasula: The Art and Science of New Media Fiction by David Banash. In 2011 he was named a Howard Fellow.

== Bibliography ==
- Tomasula, Steve. Ascension: A Novel. With design by Mervi Pakaste, Daniel Warner and others. Tuscaloosa: University of Alabama Press/Fc2, 2022. ISBN 9781573661959
- Tomasula, Steve (ed.). Conceptualisms: The Anthology of Prose, Poetry, Visual, Found, E- & Hybrid Writing as Contemporary Art. Tuscaloosa: University of Alabama Press, 2022. ISBN 9780817360412
- Tomasula, Steve. Once Human: Stories. With design by Robert Sedlack and others. Tuscaloosa: University of Alabama Press/Fc2, 2014. ISBN 9781573661768
- Tomasula, Steve. TOC: A New-Media Novel (DVD). With design by Stephen Farrell, Animations by Matt Lavoy, Programing by Christian Jara. Tuscaloosa: University of Alabama Press/Fc2, 2009. ISBN 9781573661522. Published as TOC: A New-Media Novel App for iPad, 2014. Published as TOC: A New-Media Novel, 3rd (web) Edition, Blacksburg: Virginia Tech, May 10, 2021.
- Tomasula, Steve. The Book of Portraiture: A Novel. With design by Robert Sedlack. Tallahassee: University of Florida/Fc2, 2006. ISBN 9781573661287
- Tomasula, Steve. IN & OZ. Chicago: University of Chicago Press, 2012. ISBN 9780226807447
- Tomasula, Steve. VAS: An Opera in Flatland. With design by Stephen Farrell. Chicago: University of Chicago Press, 2004. ISBN 9780226807409. Translated as: Ligature: un Opéra en pays-plat. Anne-Laure Tissut trans. Orléans, France: Les Editions HYX, 2013. Published as VAS: An Opera in Flatland, the Cyborg Edition (Limited edition book and audio CD) University of Chicago Press (book) and Chiasmus Press (CD, slipcase), 2010. ISBN 9780981502717
