= VAS: An Opera in Flatland =

2002 novel by Steve Tomasula

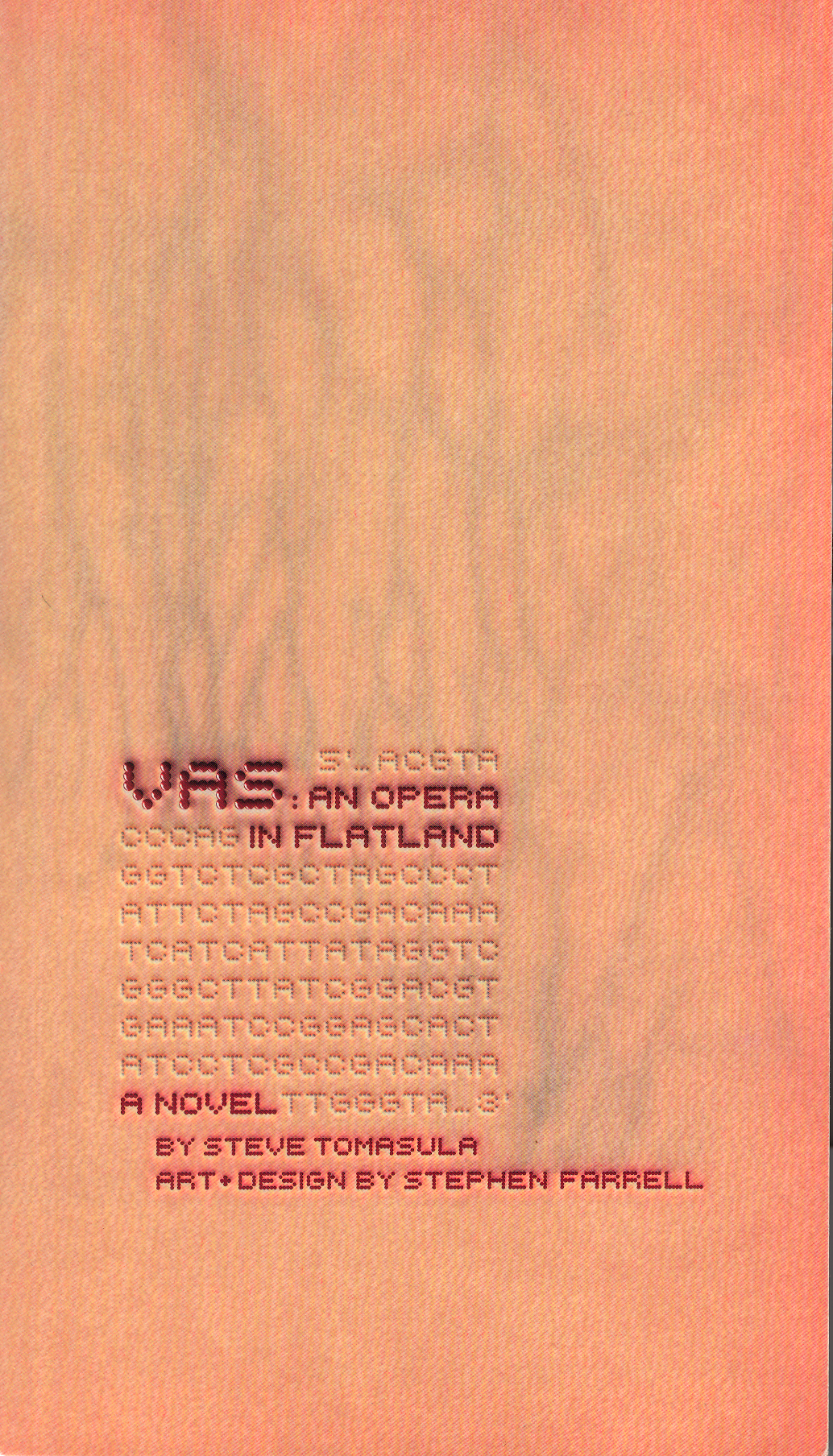
- Author: Steve Tomasula
- Illustrator: Stephen Farrell
- Language: English
- Genre: Postmodern fiction, Metafiction, Science fiction, Experimental literature
- Publisher: University of Chicago Press
- Publication date: 2002
- Publication place: United States
- Media type: Print (Hardcover, Paperback)
- Pages: 370 pp.
- ISBN: 9780226807409
- OCLC: 54843571
- LC Class: PS3620.O53 V37 2004

VAS: An Opera in Flatland is a novel by the American author Steve Tomasula with design by Stephen Farrell. It was first published in hardback in 2002, and reissued in paperback in 2004. A special “Cyborg” edition, with an audio CD was published in 2009. The novel adapts several characters and settings from Edwin A. Abbott’s novella Flatland: A Romance of Many Dimensions, first published in 1884. Set at the start of the 21st century when technologies like cloning, transplants, and other body modifications were becoming common, VAS employs a wide range of historical representations of the body from family trees and eugenic charts to visual representations of genetic sequencing. Bound in a cover that resembles human skin, the novel is printed in two colors, one that resembles flesh and one that resembles blood. It explores how definitions of the body and the self both emerge from differing narratives, and tells the story of people searching for a sense of identity in a dawning post-biological future.

== Main characters ==
=== Square ===
New arrival to Flatland, and househusband to Circle who has begun a new job. Square is writing a novel, which may be the novel that the reader is reading.

=== Circle ===
Square’s lawyer spouse and breadwinner of the family. She has already undergone at least one abortion and another miscarriage.

=== Oval ===
The daughter of Square and Circle.

=== Mother ===
Circle’s mother, mother-in-law to Square. Unaware of the complications Circle had while conceiving, she herself has a completely natural body until a port is installed in her shoulder, allowing her to be connected to IV machines.

== Plot ==
The main plot of VAS: An Opera in Flatland involves the domestic tensions that arise within the family as the character Square contemplates a request by his spouse, Circle, to undergo a medical procedure that will render him sterile. Like Edwin A. Abbott’s 1884 novella Flatland: A Romance of Many Dimensions, Square, Circle, and their daughter Oval, live in a world that is populated by two-dimensional beings, but who have many of the day-to-day concerns of contemporary life, here, those of present-day Midwestern America where the novel is set (the Flatland of the title, which also refers to the flat pages of the book in which the characters reside). In this sense, the plot is a domestic drama in which the characters contend with the realities of everyday life: love, marriage, work, the politics of the day, the education of their daughter Oval, caring for Circle’s aging mother, and other common concerns. During a previous pregnancy, an exam required for insurance purposes revealed that Circle may be carrying a fetus with a possible birth defect. On the basis of this information, Circle opted to terminate the pregnancy. Neither Square nor Circle regrets the decision, but neither wants to make a choice like that again. They also dread having to make similar weighty decisions about Circle’s aging mother. As the novel unfolds, Circle puts increasing pressure on Square to undergo a vasectomy. Simultaneously, her mother encourages both of them to go to the opera, convinced as she is that the romance of the opera will help them conceive a second child to be a brother or sister to Oval.

A number of subplots intertwine with this main action, especially historical trends and cultural developments that have led to the present of the novel. These include: the evolution of biological forces; the history of genetic policing from the early days of eugenics to contemporary genetic counseling; the close tracking between family trees and the etymologies of family names; the history of life science’s understanding of the body and its disconnect with the language used to describe it. As Square and Circle grapple with decisions that people in the past did not have to confront, the body emerges as the meeting place of culture and nature. The human body is increasingly seen as both material and information against a background of the history of body manipulation up to the present of genetically engineered plants and animals. In this sense, some critics describe the novel as being organized less by a linear plot of cause and effect, than by collage which requires readers to combine fragments to see even larger patterns. Other critics describe Tomasula’s fiction by using the principle of emergence whereby many small actions create patterns that combine with other patterns to create even larger patterns, cumulating in the culture of a time and place. In either case, the plots and subplots of VAS weave in and out of each other to create a dramatization of one ordinary family living at a time when culture at large is transitioning from that of the human to that of the posthuman, and ordinary life is shown to be enmeshed with vast forces of history and evolution.

In the penultimate scene, Square and Circle go to an opera whose climax is the staging of the nonfictional experimental surgery in which Dr. Robert J. White transplanted the head of one ape onto the body of another. The novel ends with Square in an operating theater, lying down on an operating table for the procedure.

== Main themes ==
Encyclopedic in scope, VAS insists that the reality of everyday life is composed of a collage of evolving stories based on facts that continually change as the assumptions of sciences, technologies, economies, politics, belief systems and other frames of reference change

In Edwin A. Abbott’s Flatland, Square, a two-dimensional figure drawn on a flat piece of paper, has a difficult time imaging what the phrase “Upward, not Northward” can mean. The character Square in VAS, uses this question as a metaphor for his difficulty in understanding what a post-biological future might mean to biological humans who are increasingly confronted by decisions over how to manipulate their bodies and the bodies of others that earlier generations would be hard-pressed to imagine. This existential question is the main theme of the novel. It is informed by the ability of life sciences, information sciences, histories of health care systems, government, and commercial interests to equate the body with information that can be edited and rearranged. The Flatland of VAS is a society where biology is no longer destiny as it was for previous generations, in that its inhabitants can use transplants, pharmaceuticals, plastic surgery and other body modifications to alter many facts of life that once would have been determined by nature. Technologies like synthetic hearts extend life by allowing people to live as cyborgs, while pregnancies can be terminated and the elderly can be euthanized. Technologies such as genetic engineering and in-vitro fertilization can bring into existence creatures and plants that previously could not exist in nature such as tomatoes that carry the genes of deep-diving fish to make them less susceptible to freezing, or cows with human genes that allow their organs to be transplanted into humans. For the old-body inhabitants of Flatland, the increasing malleability of bodies, and their translation into code, creates a new relationship between the self and the body, and the bodies and selves of others that is unsettling in that it becomes harder to tell where one’s self ends and the bodies of others begin (as it is impossible to define a single word without using other words).

Considering the bodies and parts of humans, plants, and animals as a text that can be edited, rearranged, and patented, is a second major theme of VAS. As such, VAS places an emphasis on the textual nature of the body, and the material nature of text, and uses the body of the book itself to develop this theme. It explores the role of language in developing these new conceptions of the body, and how the definitions of words like 'birth,' 'father,' 'daughter,' and 'death' evolve as the contexts in which they are used change. It also considers the ramifications for daily life as both bodies and texts become commodities under the language of the law in that new plants, animals, and human enhancements can be patented and their genetic code copyrighted. Values and Rules are socially constructed: VAS develops the theme of the ordinary layperson trying to navigate the glut of a new information landscape, and the small steps by which the world it describes is becoming the new natural (flat). To do so, it draws upon a number of histories, such as the history of dissection, eugenics, and animal experimentation, and draws a parallel between attempts to preserve racial purity and linguistic purity. It juxtaposes historical periods and figures to explore the ideologies and biases of science, consumerism, fashion, religion and art, as well as those of the author himself in the writing of the novel VAS: An Opera in Flatland. The novel attempts to show how it models the world as it engages in modeling. It draws readers attention to its own epistemological ties to language and genre conventions.

Far from nostalgia for a previous era, VAS uses the interrelationship between its narrative and book design to integrate poststructuralist theory with its subjects and themes to combine in a new kind of literature that can contain the contradictions of the posthuman. That is, another theme of VAS is epistemology, or how facts are created and accepted as factual, and how knowledge is produced. This theme contains within it the relationships between genders, and the dynamics of domestic politics, especially representations of masculinity, and the erosion of patriarchy.

== Style ==
While the main plot of VAS is in the tradition of the domestic novel, its form represents a radical departure from the traditional novel. As critic Anthony Ennis puts it, VAS may be the most ambitious collage novel ever written. Its main plot is composed of brief scenes, which are interwoven with a multitude of other forms, including: scientific and medical illustrations, screenshots of web pages, quotations from eugenicists and politicians, bureaucratic forms, images of scientific equipment, musical scores, comic book panels, DNA sequences, journalistic articles, scientific studies, measurements of skull volumes, measurements of Miss America bodies, pedigree charts, and grade-school textbook illustrations, among others. Its form has been compared to a hypertext given its fragmented nature, and the narrative that emerges from the associative links between its digressions, juxtapositions, and fragments. Numerous passages are written as poetry with uneven line lengths that line up with other lines to form double helixes. Bars of sheet music are set vertically along the margins of the pages as a score not for music but for lines of text from each of the three narrative voices through which VAS is told. The book’s design and physical qualities are also used as a metaphor for the story about the physicality of the body compared to its representations, and the relation between the art used to create some of these representations and political power. That is, unlike most book illustrations, the visual elements of VAS function more in the manner of the illuminations in medieval books. The many forms also call attention to their rhetorical nature, and to the novel’s own material nature, repeatedly pointing out the differences between real bodies and their representations, and the fact that both reflect beliefs, practices and material conditions of particular times and places. They also foreground the limitations of language in depicting the world, and the fact that all narratives are shaped by unconscious biases. VAS's emphasis on rhetoric implies that novels that try to create the illusion of a realistic world are naïve

== Reception ==
The initial reception of VAS: An Opera in Flatland was mixed because, as critic David Banash, noted, reviewers had difficulty describing the novel. Making a similar point, Eugene Thacker wrote that it defied characterization. The Guardian questioned whether it was even a novel, while another reviewer wondered how the novel would read if it was laid out as a traditional book. Other reviewers, however, described VAS as a “leap forward in the genre of the novel,” “ultra contemporary,” and a “spectacular” fusion of word and image. Reviewing the literature about VAS, Anthony Enns concludes that while reviews were mixed there was a consensus among literary scholars that the form and content of VAS were deeply intertwined, representing a “new kind of literature” that brings together the revolution in knowledge brought on by postmodern theory and new media technologies. Alison Gibbons observed that scholars widely describe VAS in terms such as an “unforgettably unique reading experience,” “original,” and “beguiling intricate.” Another literary critic predicted that VAS was likely to become a “seminal print work” to explore the relation between fiction and nonfiction, word and image.
