= Flatland =

1884 novella by Edwin Abbott Abbott

Flatland: A Romance of Many Dimensions
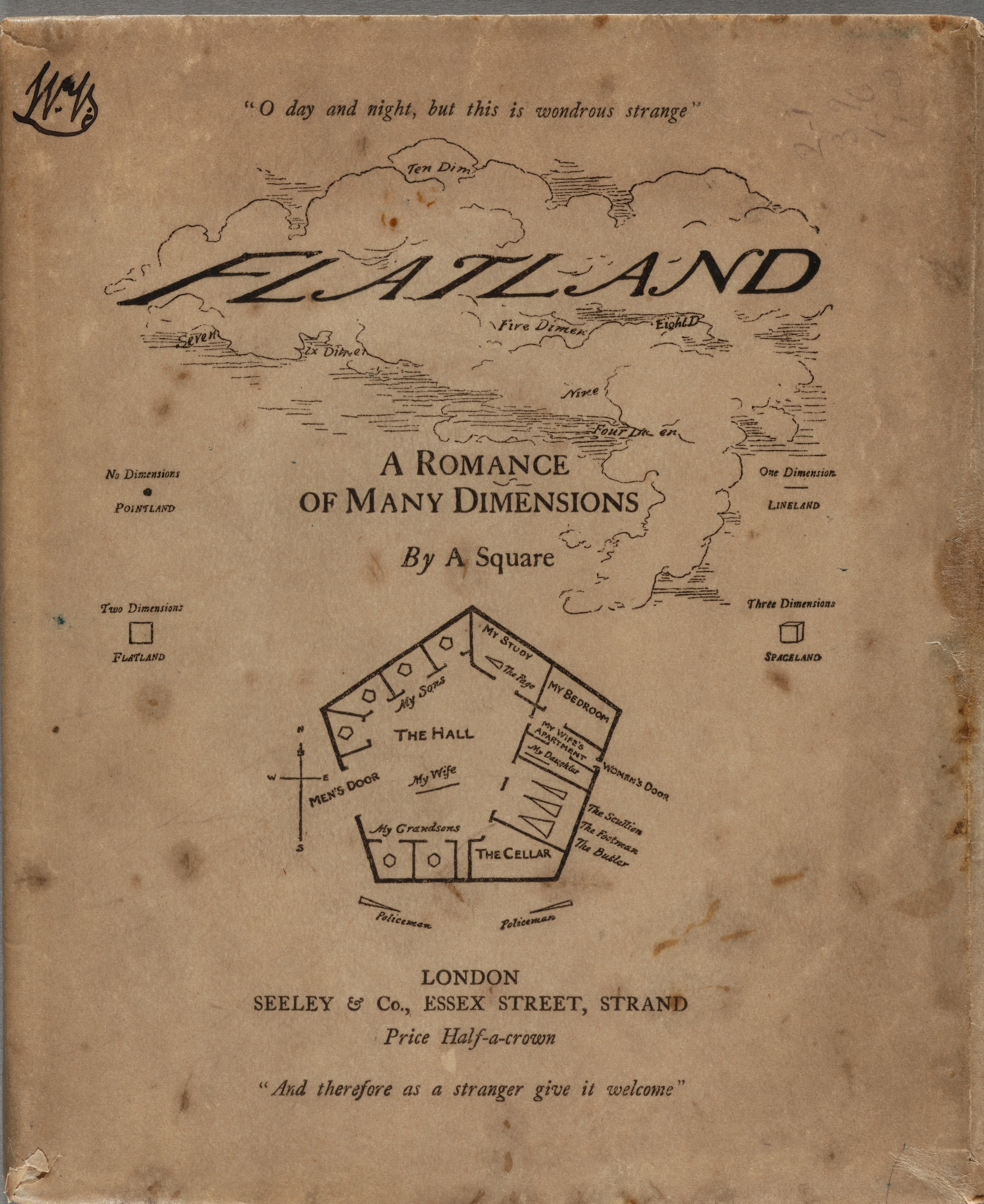
- The cover to Flatland, first edition
- Author: Edwin A. Abbott
- Illustrator: Edwin A. Abbott
- Genre: Science fiction
- Publisher: Seeley & Co.
- Publication date: 1884
- Publication place: England
- Pages: 96
- OCLC: 2306280
- LC Class: QA699
- Text: Flatland: A Romance of Many Dimensions at Wikisource

Flatland: A Romance of Many Dimensions is a satirical novella by the English theologian, Anglican priest and schoolmaster Edwin Abbott Abbott, first published in 1884 by Seeley & Co. of London. Written pseudonymously by "A Square", the book used the fictional two-dimensional world of Flatland to satirise the class and gender hierarchies of Victorian society, but the novella's more enduring contribution is its examination of dimensions.

A sequel, Sphereland, was written by Dionys Burger in 1957. Several films have been based on Flatland, including the feature film Flatland (2007). Other efforts have been short or experimental films, including one narrated by Dudley Moore and the short films Flatland: The Movie (2007) and Flatland 2: Sphereland (2012).

== Plot ==
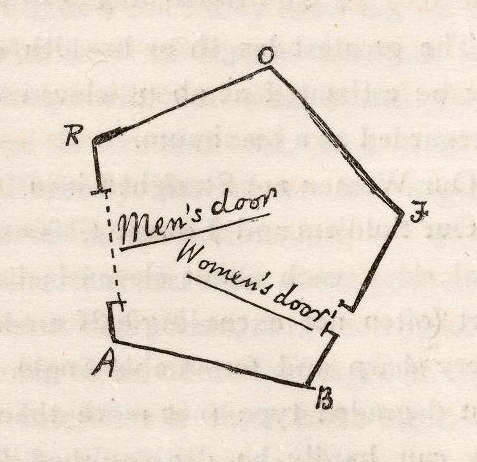
Illustration of a simple house in Flatland.

The story describes a two-dimensional world inhabited by geometric figures (flatlanders); women are line segments, while men are polygons with various numbers of sides. The narrator is a square, a member of the caste of gentlemen and professionals, who guides the readers through some of the implications of life in two dimensions. The first half of the story goes through the practicalities of existing in a two-dimensional universe, as well as a history leading up to the year 1999 on the eve of the 3rd Millennium.

On New Year's Eve, the Square dreams of a visit to a one-dimensional world, "Lineland", inhabited by men, who are lines, while the women are "lustrous points". These points and lines are unable to see the Square as anything other than a set of points on a line. Thus, the Square attempts to convince the realm's monarch of a second dimension but cannot do so. In the end, the monarch of Lineland tries to kill the Square rather than tolerate him any further.

Following this vision, the Square is visited by a sphere. Similar to the "points" in Lineland, he is unable to see the three-dimensional object as anything other than a circle (more precisely, a disk). The Sphere then levitates up and down through Flatland, allowing the Square to see the circle expand and contract between a great circle and small circles. The Sphere then tries further to convince the Square of the third dimension by dimensional analogies (a point becomes a line, a line becomes a square). The Square is still unable to comprehend the third dimension, so the Sphere resorts to deeds: he gives information about the "insides" of the house, moves a tablet through the third dimension, and even goes inside the Square for a moment. Still unable to comprehend the third dimension, the Square is taken by the Sphere to the third dimension, Spaceland. This Sphere visits Flatland at the turn of each millennium to introduce a new apostle to the idea of a third dimension in the hope of eventually educating the population of Flatland. From the safety of Spaceland, they can oversee the leaders of Flatland, acknowledging the Sphere's existence and prescribing the silencing. After this proclamation is made, many witnesses are massacred or imprisoned (according to caste), including the Square's brother.

After the Square's mind is opened to new dimensions, he tries to convince the Sphere of the theoretical possibility of the existence of a fourth dimension and higher spatial dimensions. The Sphere at first scoffs at the idea of higher dimensions, just as the Square had done, showing that his comprehension is not as broad as he had thought. Still, the Sphere returns his student to Flatland in disgrace.

The Square then has a dream in which the Sphere revisits him, this time to introduce him to a zero-dimensional space, Pointland, of whom the Point (sole inhabitant, monarch, and universe in one) perceives any communication as a thought originating in his own mind (cf. Solipsism):

"You see," said my Teacher, "how little your words have done. So far as the Monarch understands them at all, he accepts them as his own – for he cannot conceive of any other except himself – and plumes himself upon the variety of Its Thought as an instance of creative Power. Let us leave this god of Pointland to the ignorant fruition of his omnipresence and omniscience: nothing that you or I can do can rescue him from his self-satisfaction."

— the Sphere

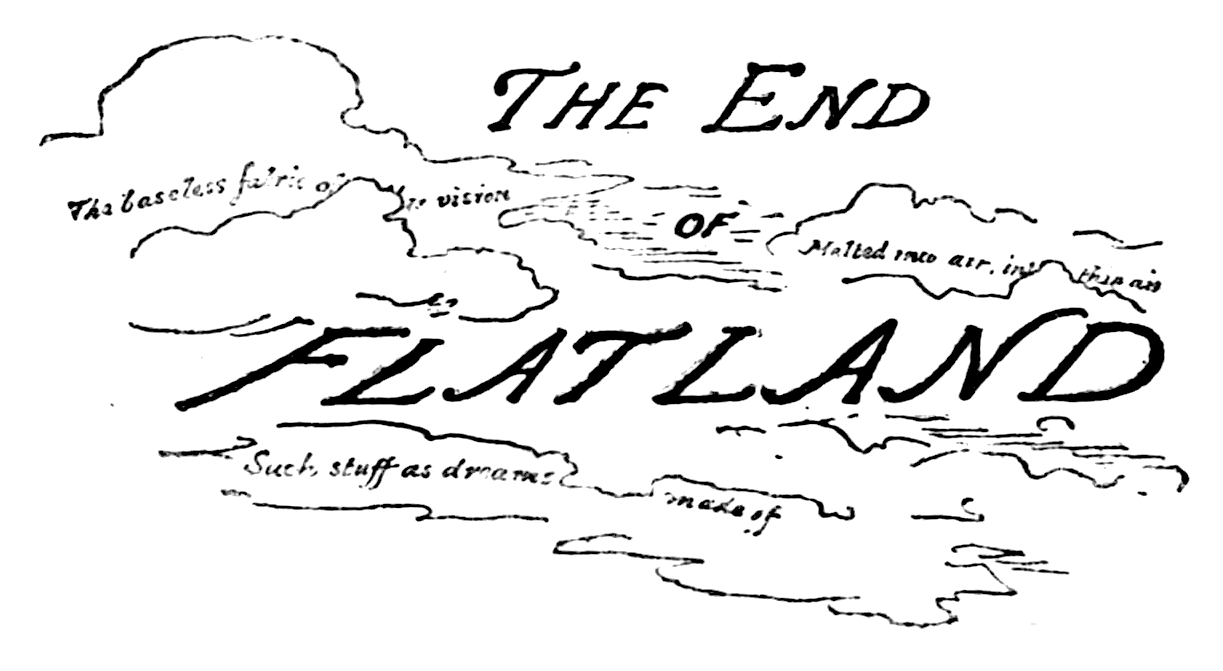
The last sketch in the book.

The Square recognises the ignorance of the monarchs of Pointland and Lineland correspond with his own (and the Sphere's) previous ignorance of the existence of higher dimensions than their own. Once returned to Flatland, the Square cannot convince anyone of Spaceland's existence, especially after official decrees are announced that anyone preaching the existence of three dimensions will be imprisoned (or executed, depending on caste). For example, he tries to convince his relative of the third dimension but cannot move a square "upward," as opposed to forward or sideways. Eventually, the Square himself is imprisoned for just this reason, with only occasional contact with his brother, who is imprisoned in the same facility. He cannot convince his brother, even after all they have both seen. Seven years after being imprisoned, "A. Square" writes out the book Flatland as a memoir, hoping to keep it as posterity for a future generation that can see beyond their two-dimensional existence.

== Social elements ==
Men are portrayed as polygons whose social status is determined by their regularity and the number of their sides, with a Circle considered the "perfect" shape. Women are lines, quite fragile but also dangerous, as they can disappear from view and possibly stab someone. To prevent this, they are required by law to sound a "peace-cry" while moving about and to use separate doors from men.

In the world of Flatland, classes are distinguished by the "Art of Hearing", the "Art of Feeling", and the "Art of Sight Recognition". Classes can be distinguished by the sound of one's voice, but the lower classes have more developed vocal organs, enabling them to feign the voice of a Polygon or even a Circle. Feeling, practised by the lower classes and women, determines the configuration of a person by feeling one of its angles. The "Art of Sight Recognition", practised by the upper classes, is aided by "Fog", which allows an observer to determine the depth of an object. With this, polygons with sharp angles relative to the observer will fade more rapidly than polygons with more gradual angles. Colour of any kind was banned in Flatland after Isosceles workers painted themselves to impersonate noble Polygons. The Square describes these events, and the ensuing class war at length.

The population of Flatland can "evolve" through the "Law of Nature", which states: "a male child shall have one more side than his father, so that each generation shall rise (as a rule) one step in the scale of development and nobility. Thus the son of a Square is a Pentagon, the son of a Pentagon, a Hexagon, and so on".

This rule is not the case when dealing with Isosceles Triangles (Soldiers and Workmen) with only two congruent sides. The smallest angle of an Isosceles Triangle gains 30 arc minutes (half a degree) each generation. Additionally, the rule does not seem to apply to many-sided Polygons. For example, the sons of several hundred-sided Polygons will often develop 50 or more sides more than their parents. Furthermore, the angle of an Isosceles Triangle or the number of sides of a (regular) Polygon may be altered during life by deeds or by surgery.

An Equilateral Triangle is a member of the craftsman class. Squares and Pentagons are the "gentlemen" class, as doctors, lawyers, and other professions. Hexagons are the lowest rank of nobility, all the way up to (near) Circles, who make up the priest class. The higher-order Polygons have much less of a chance of producing sons, preventing Flatland from being overcrowded with noblemen.

Apart from Isosceles Triangles, only regular Polygons are considered until chapter seven of the book when the issue of irregularity, or physical deformity is brought up. In a two-dimensional world, a regular polygon can be identified by a single angle and/or vertex. To maintain social cohesion, irregularity is to be abhorred, with moral irregularity and criminality cited, "by some" (in the book), as inevitable additional deformities, a sentiment with which the Square concurs. If the error of deviation is above a stated amount, the irregular Polygon faces euthanasia; if below, he becomes the lowest rank of civil servant. An irregular Polygon is not destroyed at birth, but allowed to develop to see if the irregularity can be "cured" or reduced. If the deformity remains, the irregular is "painlessly and mercifully consumed."

== As social satire ==
In Flatland, Abbott describes a society rigidly divided into classes. Social ascent is the main aspiration of its inhabitants, apparently granted to everyone but strictly controlled by the top of the hierarchy. Freedom is despised and the laws are cruel. Innovators are imprisoned or suppressed. Members of lower classes who are intellectually valuable, and potential leaders of riots, are either killed or promoted to the higher classes. Every attempt for change is considered dangerous and harmful. This world is not prepared to receive "revelations from another world". The satirical part is mainly concentrated in the first part of the book, "This World", which describes Flatland. The main points of interest are the Victorian concept of women's roles in the society and in the class-based hierarchy of men. Abbott has been accused of misogyny due to his portrayal of women in Flatland. In his Preface to the Second and Revised Edition, 1884, he answers such critics by emphasizing that the description of women was satirizing the viewpoints held, stating that the Square:

was writing as a Historian, he has identified himself (perhaps too closely) with the views generally adopted by Flatland and (as he has been informed) even by Spaceland, Historians; in whose pages (until very recent times) the destinies of Women and of the masses of mankind have seldom been deemed worthy of mention and never of careful consideration.

== Critical reception ==
Flatland did not have much success when published, although it was not entirely ignored. In the entry on Edwin Abbott in the Dictionary of National Biography for persons who died in the period of 1922 to 1930, Flatland was not even mentioned.

The book was discovered again after Albert Einstein's general theory of relativity was published, which brought to prominence the concept of a fourth dimension. Flatland was mentioned in a letter by William Garnett entitled "Euclid, Newton and Einstein" published in Nature on 12 February 1920. In this letter, Abbott is depicted, in a sense, as a prophet due to his intuition of the importance of time to explain certain phenomena:

Some thirty or more years ago a little jeu d'esprit was written by Dr. Edwin Abbott entitled Flatland. At the time of its publication it did not attract as much attention as it deserved... If there is motion of our three-dimensional space relative to the fourth dimension, all the changes we experience and assign to the flow of time will be due simply to this movement, the whole of the future as well as the past always existing in the fourth dimension.

The Oxford Dictionary of National Biography subsequently revised his biography to state that [Abbott] "is most remembered as the author of Flatland: A Romance of Many Dimensions".

Wendy Graham reviewed Flatland for Adventurer magazine and stated that "Once again a story with a message – crackpots aren't always crackpots."

== Adaptations and parodies ==
Numerous imitations or sequels to Flatland have been created. Examples include:

Films and TV

- Flatland (1965), an animated short film based on the novella, was directed by Eric Martin and based on an idea by John Hubley.
- Flatlandia (1982), an Italian stop motion short film, directed by Michele Emmer.
- Flatland (2007), a 95-minute animated independent feature film version directed by Ladd Ehlinger Jr., updates the satire from Victorian England to the modern-day United States.
- Flatland: The Movie (2007), by Dano Johnson and Jeffrey Travis, is a 34-minute animated educational film. Its sequel was Flatland 2: Sphereland (2012), inspired by the novel Sphereland by Dionys Burger.

Literature

Books and short stories inspired by Flatland include:

- An Episode on Flatland: Or How a Plain Folk Discovered the Third Dimension by Charles Howard Hinton (1907)
- The Dot and the Line: A Romance in Lower Mathematics by Norton Juster (1963)
- Sphereland by Dionys Burger (1965)
- The Incredible Umbrella by Marvin Kaye (1980)
- "Message Found in a Copy of Flatland" by Rudy Rucker (1983)
- The Planiverse by A. K. Dewdney (1984)
- Flatterland by Ian Stewart (2001)
- Spaceland by Rudy Rucker (2002)
- VAS: An Opera in Flatland (2002) by Steve Tomasula, which uses the two-dimensional world to critique contemporary society

== In popular culture ==
- Physicists and science popularizers Carl Sagan and Stephen Hawking have both commented on and postulated about the effects of Flatland. Sagan recreates the thought experiment as a set-up to discussing the possibilities of higher dimensions of the physical universe in both the book and television series Cosmos, whereas Hawking notes the peculiarity of life in two-dimensional space, as any inhabitants would necessarily be unable to digest their own food. (This concept is parodied in the episode of Futurama described below, "2-D Blacktop". The protagonists attempt to eat food while in the 2-D universe, but it falls out immediately. The native organisms in Futurama's version of Flatland absorb food somewhat like amoeba.)
- In the Star Trek: The Next Generation episode "The Loss", the USS Enterprise-D becomes trapped within a field of two-dimensional lifeforms.
- The League of Extraordinary Gentlemen, Volume 2, issue 3, in chapter 3 of the series of writings New Traveller's Almanac, it is mentioned that in an unknown basement of New York, Flatland was discovered by a mathematician.
- In the "2-D Blacktop" episode of the animated science fiction TV comedy series Futurama (season 10 episode 1, originally broadcast June 17, 2013), two spaceships moving at relativistic speeds crash head on and are compressed together into a flat disk. They meet natives of the realm, who chase after them when the concept of a third dimension is brought up.
- In David Foster Wallace's novel Infinite Jest (1996), it is briefly mentioned that students from the Enfield Tennis Academy could be seen studying and highlighting copies of Flatland on the bus.
- Flatland features in The Big Bang Theory episode "The Psychic Vortex", when Sheldon Cooper declares it one of his favourite imaginary places to visit.
- On the series The Orville, episode "New Dimensions", after entering a region of two-dimensional space Captain Ed Mercer references Flatland and its theme of social hierarchy.
- In the Sons of Anarchy episode "Straw", Clay Morrow is lounging on a cot in a private cell in county jail when he first meets retired U.S. Marshal Lee Toric. Morrow half-ignores Toric while keeping his eyes on a copy of Flatland.
- In the TV series Gravity Falls, it is implied by the main antagonist, Bill Cipher, that he originates from a dimension very similar to Flatland. In the Gravity Falls book "The Book of Bill" a picture of Flatland's cover is shown on a TV screen in the chapter titled "My Story".
- The novel appears in the 2014 film Interstellar.
- In "Behold Eck!" a 1964 episode of the science fiction anthology TV series Outer Limits, a 2-dimensional creature accidentally visits earth through a time-hole and causes some damage before it can get back home.

== See also ==
- The Dot and the Line
- Fourth dimension in literature
- Gödel, Escher, Bach
- The Planiverse
- Sphere-world
