= Technical Error =

- Short story by Arthur C. Clarke
- Country: United States
- Language: English
- Genre: Science fiction

Publication
- Published in: Thrilling Wonder Stories
- Publication date: 1950

"Technical Error" is a science fiction short story by English writer Arthur C. Clarke. It was published in 1950 under the title "The Reversed Man" and appeared again in Clarke's collection of short stories Reach for Tomorrow, in 1956.

== Plot summary ==
The first power plant to exploit superconductivity has been built, and technician Richard Nelson is "laterally inverted" following an accidental short-circuit while he is working inside the massive stator of the disassembled generator. Nelson finds himself wearing his wedding ring on the wrong hand. Written texts appear mirror-inverted, and coins and his technical diary have been affected. Nelson begins to starve; normal food does not nourish him because most biological molecules are chiral. A chemist, Prof. Vandenburg, develops mirror-inverted parallels of nutrients required by Nelson.

Ralph Hughes, the station's chief physicist, investigates the incident. He discovers that Nelson has traveled through a fourth spatial dimension. He dismisses the arguments of his curious secretary McPherson, who suspects that Albert Einstein had found this fourth dimension: time. The board of directors persuade Nelson to partake in an experiment to "re-invert" him. Moreover, nobody is sure if they can continue to meet his unique dietary requirements.

When recreating the short-circuit as closely as possible, a number of disquieting questions are raised regarding the technical parameters and specifications to meet. Subsequently, Nelson disappears during the second replicated short-circuit and, in a rush to supply power, the generator's rotor is reinstalled. It remains unclear what became of Nelson after his disappearance; his assistant remarked that there "didn't seem to be a person in the generator immediately after the accident".

In the early hours of the morning, Hughes realises that the assistant's remark that he didn't see Nelson is evidence that he had momentarily disappeared in the first inversion. This leads him to believe that Nelson must have disappeared from time, but could re-materialize inside the running generator at any moment. He does not manage to contact the power station in time, and, in the distance, above the site of the station, a giant cloud of destruction is seen rising into the sky.

== See also ==
- Mirror-image life, the concept of chemically synthesizing mirror-inverted cells
- Fourth dimension in literature
- "Left to Right", a short story with a similar premise by Isaac Asimov
- Spock Must Die!, a novel using a similar plot device
- H. G. Wells's The Plattner Story (1896), based on a similar idea

== Sources ==
- Clarke, Arthur C. (November 30, 2012). Reach for Tomorrow. RosettaBooks. ISBN 978-0-7953-2572-4.
