= Fourth dimension in literature =

Interpretations of extra dimensions

The idea of a fourth dimension has been a factor in the evolution of modern art, but use of concepts relating to higher dimensions has been little discussed by academics in the literary world. From the late 19th century onwards, many writers began to make use of possibilities opened up by the exploration of such concepts as hypercube geometry. Some writers took the fourth dimension to be one of time, which is consistent with the physical principle that space and time are fused into a single continuum known as spacetime. Others preferred to think of the fourth dimension in spatial terms, and some associated the new mathematics with wider changes in modern culture.

In science fiction, a higher "dimension" often refers to parallel or alternate universes or other imagined planes of existence. This usage is derived from the idea that to travel to parallel/alternate universes/planes of existence one must travel in a direction/dimension besides the standard ones. In effect, the other universes/planes are just a small distance away from our own, but the distance is in a fourth (or higher) spatial (or non-spatial) dimension, not the standard ones. Fifth and higher dimensions are used in the same way; for example; the Superman foe Mister Mxyzptlk comes from the fifth dimension.

== Early influence ==
Edgar Allan Poe wrote an essay on cosmology titled Eureka (1848) which said that "space and duration are one". This is the first known instance of suggesting space and time to be different perceptions of one thing. Poe arrived at this conclusion after approximately 90 pages of reasoning but employed no mathematics.

Theoretical physicist James Clerk Maxwell is best known for his work in formulating the equations of electromagnetism. He was also a prize-winning poet, and in his last poem Paradoxical Ode; Maxwell muses on connections between science, religion and nature, touching upon higher-dimensions along the way:

Since all the tools for my untying
In four-dimensioned space are lying,
Where playful fancy intersperses
Whole avenues of universes ...

— Excerpt from Maxwell's Paradoxical Ode of 1878

In The Brothers Karamazov, Dostoevsky's last work completed in 1880, the fourth dimension is used to signify that which is ungraspable to someone with earthly (or three-dimensional) concerns. In the book, Ivan Karamazov laments to his younger brother:

... I have a Euclidean earthly mind, and how could I solve problems that are not of this world? And I advise you never to think about it either, my dear Alyosha, especially about God, whether He exists or not. All such questions are utterly inappropriate for a mind created with an idea of only three dimensions.

In the 1884 satirical novella Flatland by Edwin Abbott Abbott, the two-dimensional protagonist (a square) is introduced to the concept of the third-dimension by his mentor (a sphere). After initially struggling with the idea, the square starts to speculate upon yet higher dimensions. After envisioning a tesseract, the square asks:

... shall we stay our upward course? In that blessed region of Four Dimensions, shall we linger at the threshold of the Fifth, and not enter therein? Ah, no! Let us rather resolve that our ambition shall soar with our corporal ascent. Then, yielding to our intellectual onset, the gates of the Sixth Dimension shall fly open; after that a Seventh, and then an Eighth ...

Oscar Wilde's The Canterville Ghost (A Hylo-Idealistic Romance) published in 1887 was Wilde's parody of a "haunted-house" story. The tale uses the higher spatial dimension as a handy plot device allowing a magical exit for the ghost:

There was evidently no time to be lost, so, hastily adopting the Fourth Dimension of Space as a means of escape, he vanished through the wainscoting, and the house became quite quiet.

H. G. Wells famously employed the concept of a higher temporal dimension in his 1895 book The Time Machine. Wells had already covered the subject seven years previously in his tale of The Chronic Argonauts. In this 1888 short story, inventor Dr. Nebogipfel asks the Reverend Cook:

Has it never glimmered upon your consciousness that nothing stood between men and a geometry of four dimensions – length, breadth, thickness, and duration – but the inertia of opinion? ... When we take up this new light of a fourth dimension and reexamine our physical science in its illumination ... we find ourselves no longer limited by hopeless restriction to a certain beat of time.

In Wells's 1895 short story The Remarkable Case of Davidson's Eyes, the main character sees visions of a ship – only to find out later that the ship in question was on the opposite side of the globe at the time. A doctor tries to explain how this might have happened through higher dimensions, though the narrator struggles with the concept.

... his explanation invokes the Fourth Dimension, and a dissertation on theoretical kinds of space. To talk of there being "a kink in space" seems mere nonsense to me; it may be because I am no mathematician. When I said that nothing would alter the fact that the place is eight thousand miles away, he answered that two points might be a yard away on a sheet of paper, and yet be brought together by bending the paper round. The reader may grasp his argument, but I certainly do not.

Joseph Conrad and Ford Madox Ford's 1901 work The Inheritors: An Extravagant Story uses the "fourth dimension" as a metaphor to explain a shift in society away from traditional values towards modern expediency and callous use of political power. The "inheritors" are a breed of materialists, who call themselves "Fourth Dimensionists", tasked with occupying the earth. The narrator tells how,

I heard the nature of the Fourth Dimension – heard that it was invisible to our eyes, but omnipresent ...

In the first volume of In Search of Lost Time (or Remembrance of Things Past) published in 1913, Marcel Proust envisioned the extra dimension as a temporal one. The narrator describes a church at Combray being

... for me something entirely different from the rest of the town; an edifice occupying, so to speak, a four-dimensional space – the name of the fourth being time.

Artist Max Weber's Cubist Poems, is a collection of prose first published in 1914.

Cubes, cubes, cubes, cubes,
High, low and high, and higher, higher,
Far, far out, out, far ...

Billions of things upon things
This for the eye, the eye of being,
At the edge of the Hudson,
Flowing timeless, endless,
On, on, on, on ...

— Excerpt from The Eye Moment, a Weber poem published in 1914

Algernon Blackwood's short story "A Victim of Higher Space" (1914) has a character who enters and leaves the fourth and higher dimensions involuntarily, and is taught to prevent this from happening by John Silence.

... accidentally, as the result of my years of experiment, I one day slipped bodily into the next world, the world of four dimensions, yet without knowing precisely how I got there, or how I could get back again. I discovered, that is, that my ordinary three-dimensional body was but an expression—a projection—of my higher four-dimensional body!

Poet Ezra Pound finishes his 1937 Canto 49 (often known as "the Seven Lakes") with these lines:

The fourth; the dimension of stillness.
And the power over wild beasts.

== Other works ==
The architect in Robert A. Heinlein's "—And He Built a Crooked House—" constructs a home resembling this tesseract net.

Science fiction author Robert A. Heinlein used ideas derived from multi-dimensional geometry in some of his stories. "—And He Built a Crooked House—" was first published in Astounding Science Fiction magazine in February 1941. In the story, a recently graduated architect constructs an eight-room home for his friend based on an "unfolded tesseract". An earthquake collapses or "folds" the structure, leading to all eight rooms being contained within just one. The stairs appear to form a closed loop, and there seems to be no way of leaving, as all the doors and even the windows lead directly into other rooms. Heinlein's 1963 fantasy novel Glory Road (originally serialized in The Magazine of Fantasy & Science Fiction) features a device called a fold box which is bigger on the inside than the outside. In his 1980 novel The Number of the Beast, a "continua device" formulated using "theories on n-dimensional non-euclidean geometry" gives the protagonists the ability to time-travel and to visit fictional universes.

Arthur C. Clarke published the 1950 short story "Technical Error", which explored the effects on a man after he had been rotated in the fourth dimension.

In her 1957 novel The Strange World of Planet X – adapted from her own screenplay for an earlier 6-part British television series – author Rene Ray tells the story of a pair of scientists whose experiments with magnetic fields open what seems to be a pathway into a fourth dimension. One of the two researchers is driven by a lust for power and recognition to proceed without caution, while his colleague becomes increasingly alarmed at the forces with which they may be tampering – with the wife of the former caught between them – and this conflict and the dangers entailed in their experiments make up the major part of the story.

Published in 1962, Madeleine L'Engle's award-winning A Wrinkle in Time revolves around a girl called Meg whose scientist father disappears after working on a mysterious project. In a chapter entitled "The Tesseract", Mrs Whatsit and Mrs Who (both immortals) use the analogy of small insect making a long journey across a length of material in order to explain instantaneous travel across the universe: "Swiftly Mrs Who brought her hands, still holding the skirt, together. 'Now you see ... he would be there ... that is how we travel.'" Meg declares herself to be a "moron" for not understanding the concept (known in the book as "tessering"). Luckily, her telepathic younger brother clarifies the matter, by telling Meg that the fourth dimension of time and the fifth of the tesseract combine, enabling Euclidean geometry-contravening short-cuts to be taken through space.

In Kurt Vonnegut's 1969 work Slaughterhouse-Five, recurring character Kilgore Trout writes a book called Maniacs in the Fourth Dimension which relates how "three-dimensional Earthling doctors" were unable to cure people with mental diseases, "as the causes ... were all in the fourth dimension". Trout also explains how "... vampires and werewolves and goblins and angels" reside in this alternative plane, alongside poet William Blake.

The book Surfing through Hyperspace by Clifford A. Pickover specifically deals with fourth spatial dimensional creatures and contains a story involving two FBI agents musing over the implications of such beings existing.

Death's End, the 2010 final novel in Liu Cixin's Remembrance of Earth's Past trilogy, begins with an introduction in which a woman gains the ability to reach inside closed spaces and remove the contents during the Fall of Constantinople. Later in the novel, two interstellar ships enter a four-dimensional fragment of space. While within this fragment, the crew of the ships can enter the fourth dimension. From the fourth dimension, they can see the interior and all sides of any 3D object, much like how humans can see every aspect of a 2D shape from the third dimension.

The 2019 novel The Last Reincarnation of Steven Kinder by Bernard K. Finnigan, and its subsequent 2021 sequel "The Human Sliver" deals with the fourth dimension as a series of parallel Earths, accessible to certain humans with an extra-dimensional sense. The extra spatial dimension is used as a hiding place for aliens preying on 3D humans, and for physics applications when battling 4D creatures immune to conventional human weapons.

== In film and television ==
Aside from Hyperspace as a plot device for faster than light space travel, there are only a few examples of film or television productions that have explored the possible consequences of human access to a fourth dimension.

- In the 1959 science fiction film 4D Man, a scientist accessed the fourth dimension and gained the ability to move through solid objects at will, and to drain the future life out of other people.
- In "The Borderland", a 1963 episode of the original television series The Outer Limits, an accidental four-dimensional rotation of a human hand heralded the beginning of an attempt by a scientific team to enter the fourth dimension.
- In the 2014 film Interstellar, the fourth dimension is represented as time, which can be physically traversed by a human. After entering a black hole, the protagonist finds himself inside a "tesseract", a four-dimensional cube constructed by higher-dimensional beings. This structure allows him to perceive time as a physical landscape, viewing moments from his daughter's past simultaneously. The consequence of this access is the ability to interact with the past by physically manipulating gravitational waves, allowing him to send crucial data across spacetime.
- In the 1968 film 2001: A Space Odyssey, while the term "fourth dimension" is not explicitly stated, the final act is widely interpreted as a cinematic depiction of a journey into a higher-dimensional reality. After encountering a monolith, astronaut Dave Bowman is pulled into the "Star Gate", a sequence that visually represents a passage through the fabric of space and time that defies conventional physics.
- In the 2006 film The 4th Dimension, a woman brings a man who works at an antique shop a clock that is not to be fixed. Strange things begin to happen, including finding a journal of Albert Einstein. One review from the link states; "Stylistically channeling David Lynch and Darren Aronofsky, The 4th Dimension is a densely etched portrait of a young man's descent into insanity"

== See also ==
- Flatland
- Four-dimensional space § In literature
- Fourth dimension in art
- List of four-dimensional games
- Non-Euclidean geometry
- Science fiction
- Tesseract
