= L-Ribonucleic acid aptamer =

RNA-like molecule

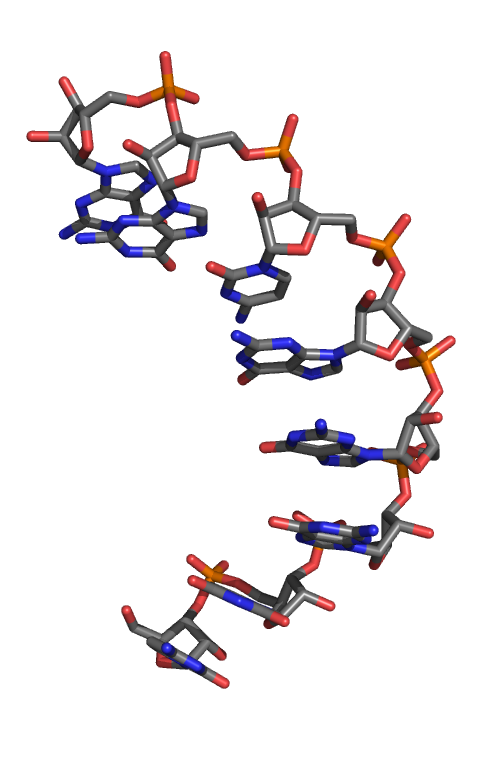
3-D structural model of an L-RNA aptamer fragment

An L-ribonucleic acid aptamer (L-RNA aptamer, trade name Spiegelmer) is an RNA-like molecule built from L-ribose units. It is an artificial oligonucleotide named for being a mirror image of natural oligonucleotides. L-RNA aptamers are a form of aptamers. Due to their L-nucleotides, they are highly resistant to degradation by nucleases. L-RNA aptamers are considered potential drugs and are currently being tested in clinical trials.

== Features ==
=== Chemical properties ===

L-RNA aptamers, built using L-ribose, are the enantiomers of natural oligonucleotides, which are made with D-ribose. Nucleic acid aptamers, including L-RNA aptamers, contain adenosine monophosphate, guanosine monophosphate, cytidine monophosphate, uridine monophosphate, a phosphate group, a nucleobase and a ribose sugar.

=== Biological characteristics ===
Like other aptamers, L-RNA aptamers are able to bind molecules such as peptides, proteins, and substances of low molecular weight. The affinity of L-RNA aptamers to their target molecules often lies in the pico to nanomolar range and is thus comparable to antibodies.

L-RNA aptamers themselves have low antigenicity. In contrast to other aptamers, L-RNA aptamers have high stability in blood serum, since they are less susceptible to be cleaved hydrolytically by enzymes. They are excreted by the kidneys in a short time due to their low molar mass (which is below the renal threshold).

L-RNA aptamers modified with a higher molar mass, such as PEGylated L-RNA aptamers, show a prolonged plasma half-life.

== Production ==
Unlike other aptamers, L-RNA aptamers are not directly made using systematic evolution of ligands by exponential enrichment (SELEX), as L-nucleic acids are not amenable to enzymatic methods, such as polymerase chain reaction (PCR), used in SELEX. Therefore, the selection is done with mirrored target molecules.

=== Reflection of the target molecule ===
The first step is the production of the target's enantiomer. In the case of peptides and small proteins that are produced synthetically, an enantiomer is made using synthetic D-amino acids. If the target is a larger protein molecule, beyond synthetic abilities, the enantiomer of an epitope is produced.

=== SELEX ===
Conventional (up to 10^{16} different oligonucleotides) existing molecule library serves as a starting point for the subsequent SELEX process. Selection, separation, and amplification using the mirror image of the target molecule is performed.

=== Sequencing and synthesis ===
The sequence of the oligonucleotide selected using SELEX is determined with the help of DNA sequencing. This information is used for the synthesis of the oligonucleotide's enantiomer, the L-RNA aptamer, using L-nucleotides.

== Use ==
L-RNA aptamers have been obtained for the chemokines CCL2 and CXCL12, the complement components C5a and ghrelin. They are currently in preclinical or clinical development. Proof-of-concept for an anti-CCL2/MCP-1 L-RNA aptamers has recently been demonstrated in diabetic nephropathy patients. They can also be used as diagnostic agents.

== See also ==
- Aptamer
