= Maria Tomasula =

American painter and educator

- Born: 1958 (age 67–68); East Chicago, IN
- Education: University of Illinois Chicago (BFA) Northwestern University (MFA)
- Occupations: Artist & educator
- Employer: University of Notre Dame
- Website: https://www.mariatomasula.com/

Maria Tomasula (born 1958) is an American painter and educator, known for her highly detailed still life paintings that combine realism, Catholic symbolism, and Mexican American cultural themes. She was formerly a professor of art at the University of Notre Dame, and is most often recognized for her paintings that explore ideas about life, death, spirituality, identity, and memory through symbolic objects such as flowers, skulls, insects, fruit, and bones.

Art historians and critics often connect Tomasula's work to the Neo-Baroque movement due to her use of dramatic lighting, rich colors, and highly realistic detail. Scholars have also connected her work to Mexican Catholic traditions, Day of the Dead imagery, and themes of martyrdom and sacrifice. Critics from publications such as the New York Times and the Chicago Tribune have praised her ability to combine realistic technique with symbolic meaning.

== Early life and education ==
Maria Tomasula was born in 1958 and grew up in East Chicago, Indiana, in a Mexican American community. She grew up surrounded by murals and images connected to the likes of César Chávez, Emiliano Zapata, the Mexican Revolution, and Aztec symbolism. She has explained that growing up in this environment shaped her understanding of identity and community.

Tomasula was also heavily influenced by Catholicism. She attended Spanish-speaking Catholic churches as a child and later described the churches as being filled with dramatic images of saints, sculptures, and religious paintings. In an interview discussed in Flowers Disguised, she remembered seeing graphic images of saints who were "tormented, skinned and flayed," experiences that later inspired the emotional and symbolic quality of her art. Tomasula received her Bachelor of Fine Arts from the University of Illinois Chicago, and later attended graduate school, receiving her Master of Fine Arts from Northwestern University, where she decided to focus on more traditional styles of painting as opposed to the Neo-Expressionist styles that had become popular at the time.

== Career ==
Tomasula became known for her carefully painted oil still lifes. Her paintings are often compared to seventeenth century Dutch still life works because of their extreme detail, dramatic lighting, and realistic textures. Scholar Soo Y. Kang compared her style to Dutch painter Rachel Ruysch because both artists created vivid arrangements of flowers and symbolic objects.

Her career gained wider attention during the 1990s. In a 1997 review for the Chicago Tribune, art critic Alan G. Artner wrote that Tomasula's newer paintings showed greater sophistication and praised the way her work balanced realism with imagination and symbolism. He went on to note that her paintings often preserved flowers and fruit "at the outer edge of decay," emphasizing ideas about mortality and permanence.

In 2000, art critic James Yood wrote Maria Tomasula: Accretion, which focused on her exhibition Accretion and discussed the growing complexity of her symbolic still lifes. This exhibition helped to establish her reputation within the world of American contemporary painting.

In 2003, The New York Times reviewed her exhibition Second Nature at Forum Gallery in New York. Art critic Ken Johnson described her paintings as "magic realist-style still-life paintings" and connected her work to Renaissance traditions due to her use of symbolic objects and themes regarding mortality.

Tomasula later became a professor of art at the University of Notre Dame. In 2019 she gave a visiting lecture at Ball State University, where she discussed realism, religion, and identity in her artwork. During the lecture, she explained that art is not only about self expression but also about "advocating a position." She went on to describe her interest in understanding herself through art and explained that her experiences with Catholicism shaped the way she views the world.

== Artistic style and themes ==
=== Still life and realism ===
Tomasula's paintings are known for their intense realism, dark backgrounds, dramatic lighting, and carefully arranged symbolic objects. In her work she frequently portrays flowers, fruit, insects, ribbons, gloves, skulls, and bones in great detail. Her work is strongly connected to the tradition of Dutch Baroque still life painting, especially in works that remind viewers of the temporary nature of beauty and life.

=== Mexican American and Catholic influences ===
Although Tomasula uses European painting techniques, scholars argue that her work is deeply connected to her Mexican American identity and Catholic upbringing. Many of her paintings include symbols connected to Catholicism and the Day of the Dead, two examples being Royalty and Please Don't Go. These works feature skulls, flowers, food, and decorative arrangements that resemble Mexican ofrendas, or altars created for deceased loved ones.

In Embedded Still Lifes, scholar Soo Y. Kang argued that Tomasula combines European Catholic traditions with Indigenous beliefs about life and death. Kang describes this mixture as an example of syncretism, meaning that two different cultural traditions are blended together into a brand new form of expression.

=== Feminist themes ===
Scholars have also interpreted Tomasula's work as exploring women's experiences and suffering. In Flowers Disguised, Soo Y. Kang explains that Tomasula's paintings often connect flowers to women's labor, sacrifice, and resilience. The flowers in many works are pinned, stretched, pierced, or sewn together, which scholars compare to images of Catholic martyrdom.

Paintings such as Web and Recure use flowers as symbolic substitutes for human figures. Tomasula herself explained that she paints flowers and insects metaphorically to represent people and shared human experiences. Scholars have argued that these damaged but still beautiful flowers represent endurance and survival, especially for Mexican American women.

== Notable works ==
Some of Tomasula's best known works include:

- Web (2002)
- Recure (2002)
- Royalty (2008)
- Please Don't Go (2010)
- The Structure of Coincidence (2004)
- Second Nature (2003 exhibition)
- Accretion (2000 exhibition)

== Recognition ==
Tomasula's work has been reviewed and discussed in major art publications and newspapers, including The New York Times, and the Chicago Tribune. Scholars studying contemporary Latinx art and religion have described her paintings as important examples of Mexican American artistic expression and Catholic symbolism in modern art.
