= D-peptide =

Class of amino acids

A D-peptide is a short sequence of D-amino acids connected by peptide bonds. Since ribosomes are specific to L-amino acids, the vast majority of naturally occurring peptides and proteins are composed of L-amino acids. One exception are the D-peptides in the peptidoglycan of bacterial cell walls. D-peptides rarely occur naturally in organisms and are not easily digested or degraded.

D-peptide peptidomimetics are D-peptides designed to mimic natural L-peptides that commonly have therapeutic properties. A peptide with secondary structure cannot be mimicked by its retro-inverse, as linking in the reverse order breaks many backbone interactions essential for the secondary structure. An approach to mimicking these peptides is by searching for similar (sidechain) structures in a mirrored copy of the Protein Data Bank for the structured elements, and then linking the sections by retro-inversed versions of the loops found in the original protein.

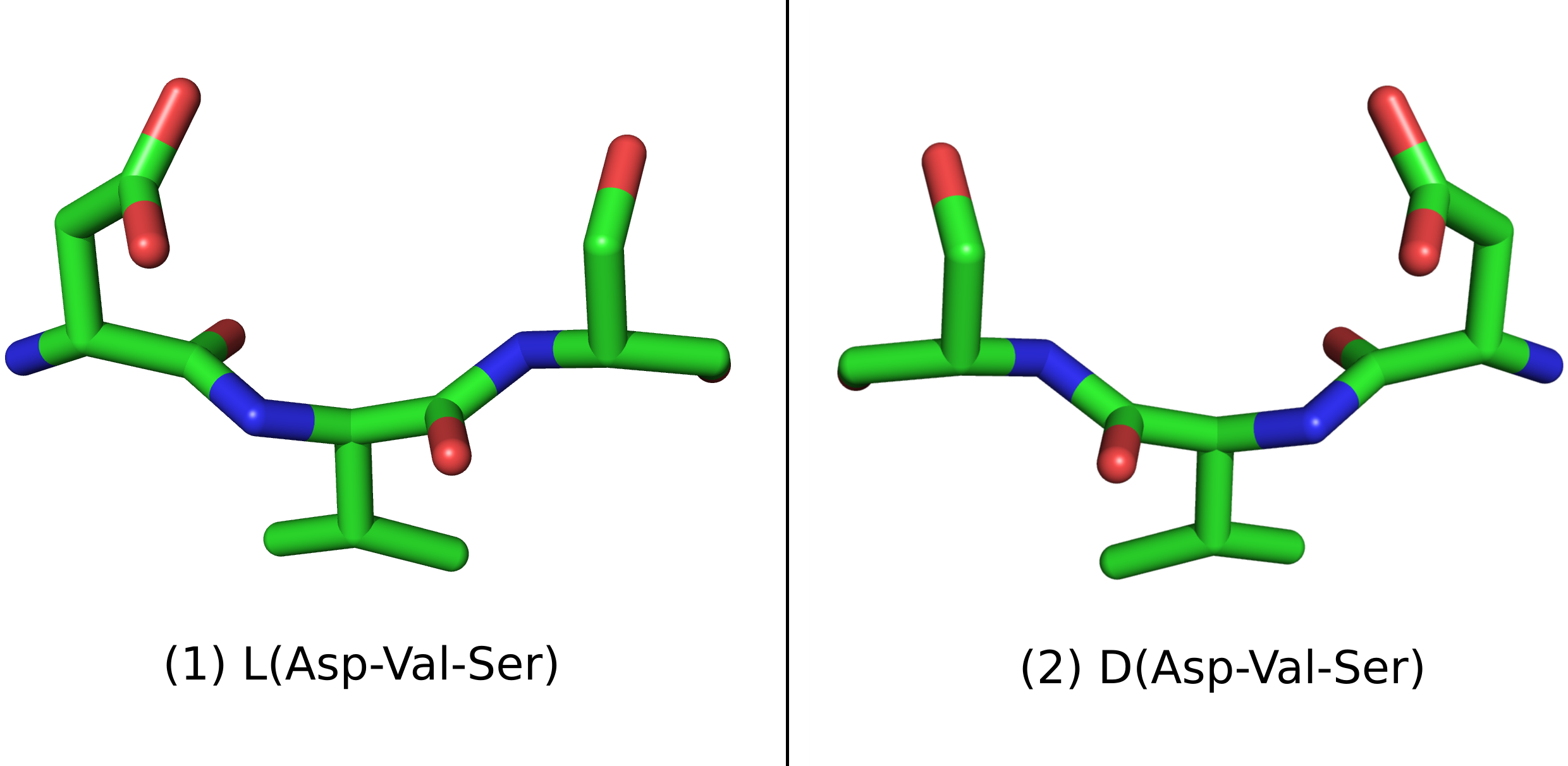
Figure 2. D-peptides assume the mirror image conformation of their L-peptide analogues. Many D-proteins and other D-peptides when placed in a nonchiral solvent like water, assume the mirror image conformation of their L-peptide counterpart. Pictured is an L-peptide (1) fragment with the sequence Asp-Val-Ser and the D-peptide Asp-Val-Ser (2) shown from C-terminus to N-terminus.

When placed in a nonchiral solvent like water, D-peptides, as well as the larger polypeptide D-proteins, have similar but mirrored properties to the L-peptides and L-proteins with identical sequences. If an L-protein does not require a chaperone or a structural cofactor to fold, its D-enantiomer protein should have a mirror image conformation with respect to the L-protein (Figure 2). A D-enzyme should act on substrates of reverse chirality compared to the L-enzyme with the same sequence. Similarly, if an L-peptide binds to an L-protein, their D-peptide and D-protein counterparts should bind together in a mirrored way.

D-peptides also have properties that make them attractive as drugs. D-peptides are less susceptible to be degraded in the stomach or inside cells by proteolysis. D-peptide drugs can, therefore, be taken orally and are effective for a longer period of time. D-peptides are easy to synthesize when compared to many other drugs. In some cases, D-peptides can have a low immunogenic response.

== Ret design ==
An L-peptide has three analogue sequences (Figure 3) built from L and D amino acids: the D-enantiomer or inverso-peptide with the same sequence, but composed of D-amino acids and a mirror conformation; the retro-peptide, consisting of the same sequence of L amino acids but in reverse order; and the retro-inverso or D-retro-enantiomer peptide, consisting of D-amino acids in the reversed sequence.

While the L-peptide and its D-enantiomer are mirror structures of each other, the L-retro-peptide is the mirror image of the D-retro-inverso-peptide. On the other hand, the L-peptide and the D-retro-inverso-peptide share a similar arrangement of side-chains, although their carboxyl and amino groups point in opposing directions. For small peptides that do not depend on a secondary structure for binding, an L-peptide and its D-retro-inverso-peptide is likely to have a similar binding affinity with a target L-protein.

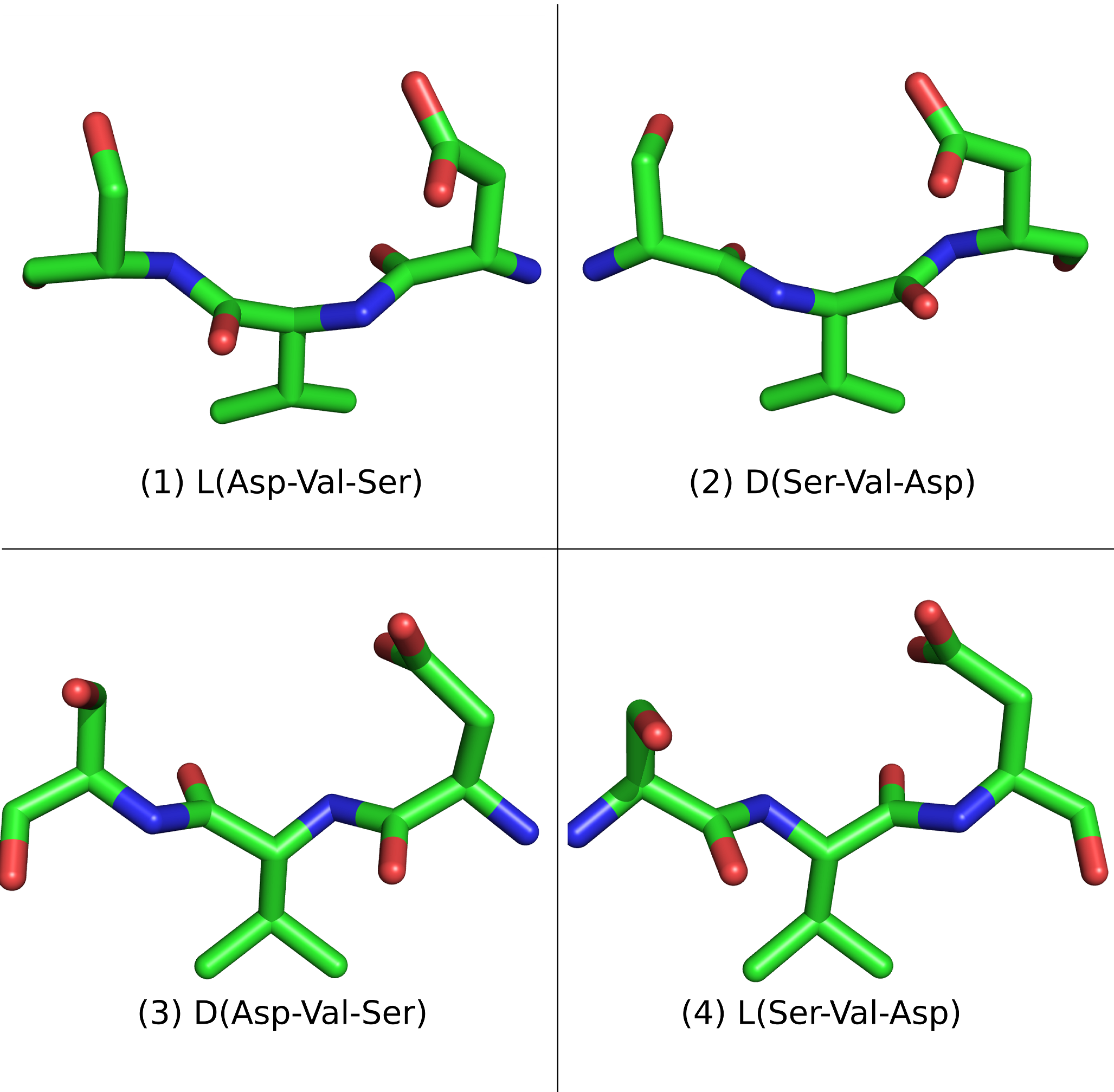
Figure 3. An L-peptide and its analogues. An L-peptide (1) sequence has three analogues: the D-enantiomer (3) with the same sequence, the retro L-peptide (4) with the inverted sequence, and the retro-inverso D-peptide(2), with all D-amino acids and the inverted sequence. In this image (1) and (3) are shown from C-terminus on the left to N-terminus on the right, while (2) and (4) are shown from N-terminus to C-terminus. Note that (1) and (2) have similar side chain positions; one is the retro-inverso sequence of the other. The same applies to (3) and (4).

== Mirror-image phage display ==
Phage display is a technique to screen large libraries of peptides for binding to a target protein. In phage display, the DNA sequence that codes the potential drug-peptide is fused to the gene of the protein coat of bacteriophages and introduced into a vector. Diversity can be introduced to the peptide by mutagenesis. The protein coats peptides are then expressed and purified, and applied to a surface of immobilized protein targets. The surface is then washed away to remove non-binding peptides, while the remaining binding peptides are eluted.

Mirror-image phage display is a similar method that can be used to screen large libraries of D-peptides that bind to target L-proteins. More precisely, since D-peptides can not be expressed in bacteriophages, mirror-image phage display screens L-peptides that bind to immobilized D-proteins that are previously chemically synthesized. Because of the mirror properties of D-peptides, the D-enantiomer of an L-peptide that binds to a D-protein will bind to the L-protein.

Mirror-image phage display, however, has two disadvantages when compared to phage display. Target D-proteins must be chemically synthesized, which is normally an expensive and time-consuming process. Also, the target protein must not require a cofactor or a chaperone to fold, otherwise the chemically synthesized D-protein will not fold to the target, mirror structure.

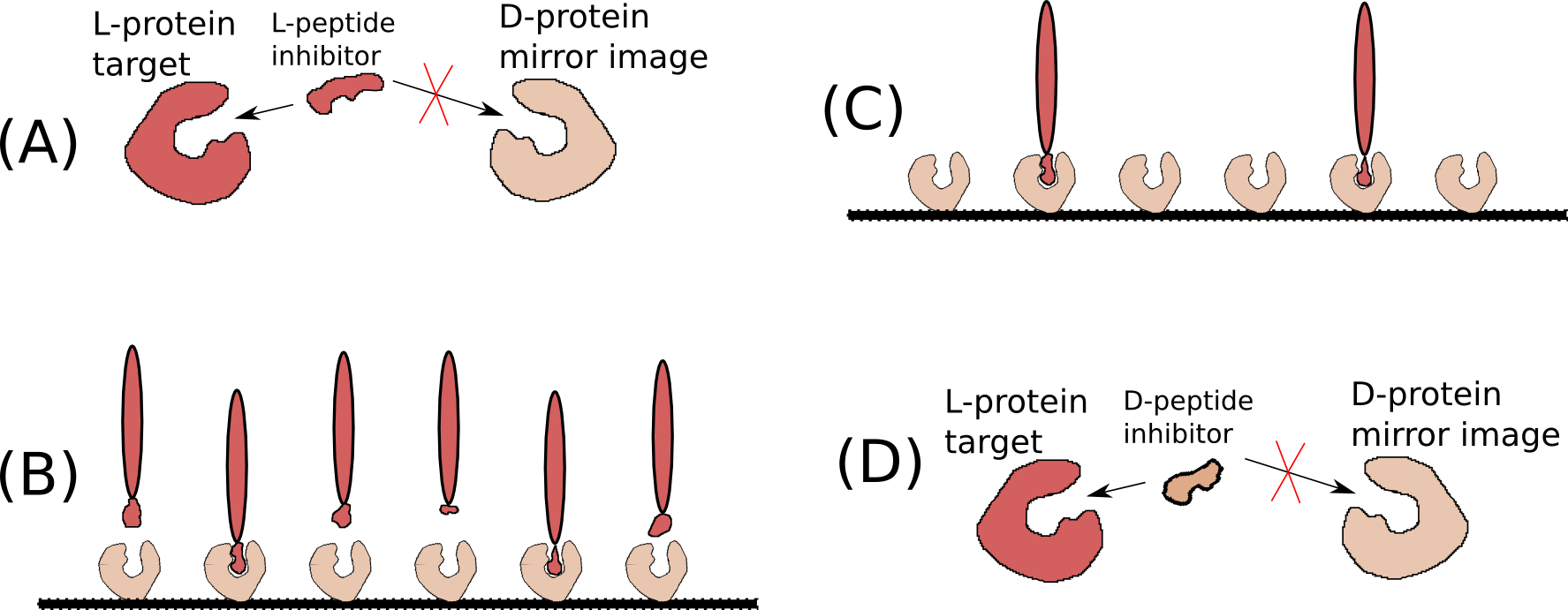
Figure 4. Mirror image phage display. (A) A target L-amino acid protein (L-protein) for which an L-peptide inhibitor might be available is selected. The D-enantiomer protein (D-protein) is chemically synthesized from the same sequence using D-amino acids. If the target L-protein does not require a chaperone or co-factor to fold, the D-protein will mirror the conformation and properties of the L-protein, but the L-peptide inhibitor will most likely have little binding affinity towards it. (B) The synthesized D-proteins are fixed to a surface and exposed to phage displaying many different L-peptides. (C) L-peptides that do not bind well to the surface are washed away. The remaining L-peptides are sequenced. (D) The D-enantiomer peptides (D-peptides) of the binding L-peptides are synthesized using the same sequence and tested against the L-proteins. The D-peptide will bind the L-protein but most likely not bind the D-protein mirror.
