= Sphereland =

1957 novel by Dionijs Burger

Sphereland: A Fantasy About Curved Spaces and an Expanding Universe
- First edition
- Author: Dionys Burger
- Original title: Bolland : een roman van gekromde ruimten en uitdijend heelal
- Translator: Cornelie J. Rheinboldt
- Language: Dutch
- Subject: Mathematics, Flatland, The Big Bang, Dimensions
- Genre: Science fiction/science
- Publication date: 1957
- Publication place: United States
- English publication date: 1965
- Media type: Print
- Pages: 208

Sphereland: A Fantasy About Curved Spaces and an Expanding Universe (Dutch: Bolland : een roman van gekromde ruimten en uitdijend heelal) is a 1957 novel by Dionys Burger, and is a sequel to Flatland, a novel by "A Square" (a pen name of Edwin Abbott Abbott). The novel expands upon the social and mathematical foundations on which Flatland is based. It is markedly different from the first novel in that it has a more prosaic ending and treatment of society.

== Plot summary ==
The Circles (who are appointed as priests/leaders of Flatland due to their many sides, or an appearance thereof) do not take A Square's revelation about a third dimension to be accurate, and A Square is ostracized by his community. Then after some time, society becomes more open to the ideas of Spaceland and, overall, to change and advancement. However, when a prominent surveyor finds a Triangle with more than 180 degrees, he is fired from his job and generally considered a crackpot, since such a construction is not possible in Euclidean geometry. He eventually makes friends with the grandson of A Square, A Hexagon, because he is a mathematician and scientist. Together, they come upon a theory to explain the unusual measurements: they actually live on a very large sphere, and the Triangles have more than 180 degrees due to being inscribed on a non-planar surface.

With help from the sphere from the first novel, they are able to prove this theory. However, the established scientific community is not able to comprehend the idea proposed by the two, and thus they do not attempt to enlighten Flatland. Furthermore, as the residents of Flatland advance, they begin to travel in space; they see distant worlds like their own, and the surveyor tries to find the distance between their world and these distant worlds, using trigonometry and radar. From his calculations, he and the hexagon determine that the universe is expanding; again they try to reveal this theory to the outside world, but again it is not accepted. Therefore, like his grandfather in the previous novel, the hexagon writes a book that is not to be opened until the theory of the expanding universe is discovered and accepted by others. Then they live an inferior existence without any more contact with the sphere.

== Adaptations and parodies ==
In 2012 the creators of Flatland: The Movie released an educational sequel film, Flatland 2: Sphereland, based in part on Burger's Sphereland, that dealt with the topics of curved spaces, symmetry and congruence, an expanding universe, and the multiverse. Actors Kristen Bell, Danny Pudi, Michael York, Tony Hale, Danica McKellar, and Kate Mulgrew provide voices for the 36-minute animated movie.

== See also ==
- Fourth dimension
- Flatterland, another sequel to Flatland
