= A. K. Dewdney =

Canadian mathematician and author (1941–2024)

- Born: August 5, 1941; London, Ontario, Canada
- Died: March 9, 2024 (aged 82); London, Ontario, Canada
- Occupations: Mathematician, computer scientist, author, filmmaker

Alexander Keewatin Dewdney (August 5, 1941 – March 9, 2024) was a Canadian mathematician, computer scientist, author, filmmaker, and conspiracy theorist. Dewdney was the son of Canadian artist and author Selwyn Dewdney and art therapist Irene Dewdney, and brother of poet Christopher Dewdney.

== Personal life ==
Dewdney was born in London, Ontario on August 5, 1941, and died there on March 9, 2024, at the age of 82.

== Art and fiction ==
In his student days, Dewdney made a number of influential experimental films, including Malanga, on the poet Gerald Malanga, Four Girls, Scissors, and his most ambitious film, the pre-structural Maltese Cross Movement. Margaret Atwood wrote that Dewdney's poetry scrapbook based on that film "raises scrapbooking to an art".

The Academy Film Archive has preserved two of Dewdney's films: The Maltese Cross Movement in 2009 and Wildwood Flower in 2011.

Dewdney wrote two novels, The Planiverse (about an imaginary two-dimensional world) and Hungry Hollow: The Story of a Natural Place. Dewdney lived in London, Ontario where he held the position of Professor Emeritus at the University of Western Ontario.

== Computing, mathematics, and science ==
Dewdney wrote a number of books on mathematics, computing, and bad science. He also founded and edited a magazine on recreational programming called Algorithm between 1989 and 1993.

Dewdney followed Martin Gardner and Douglas Hofstadter in authoring Scientific American magazine's recreational mathematics column, renamed to "Computer Recreations", then "Mathematical Recreations", from 1984 to 1991. He published more than 10 books on scientific possibilities and puzzles. Dewdney was a co-inventor of programming game Core War.

Beginning in the nineties, Dewdney worked on biology, both as a field ecologist and as a mathematical biologist, contributing a solution to the problem of determining the underlying dynamics of species abundance in natural communities.

== Conspiracy theories ==
Dewdney was a member of the 9/11 truth movement, and believed that the planes used in the September 11 attacks had been emptied of passengers and were flown by remote control.

== Works ==
- The Planiverse: Computer Contact with a Two-Dimensional World (1984). ISBN 0-387-98916-1.
- The Armchair Universe: An Exploration of Computer Worlds (1988). ISBN 0-7167-1939-8. (collection of "Mathematical Recreations" columns)
- The Magic Machine: A Handbook of Computer Sorcery (1990). ISBN 0-7167-2144-9. (collection of "Mathematical Recreations" columns)
- The New Turing Omnibus: Sixty-Six Excursions in Computer Science (1993). ISBN 0-8050-7166-0.
- The Tinkertoy Computer and Other Machinations (1993). ISBN 0-7167-2491-X. (collection of "Mathematical Recreations" columns)
- Introductory Computer Science: Bits of Theory, Bytes of Practice (1996). ISBN 0-7167-8286-3.
- 200% of Nothing: An Eye Opening Tour Through the Twists and Turns of Math Abuse and Innumeracy (1996). ISBN 0-471-14574-2.
- Yes, We Have No Neutrons: An Eye-Opening Tour through the Twists and Turns of Bad Science (1997). ISBN 0-471-29586-8.
- Hungry Hollow: The Story of a Natural Place (1998). ISBN 0-387-98415-1.
- A Mathematical Mystery Tour: Discovering the Truth and Beauty of the Cosmos (2001). ISBN 0-471-40734-8.
- Beyond Reason: Eight Great Problems that Reveal the Limits of Science (2004). ISBN 0-471-01398-6.
