= Dionys Burger =

Dionys Burger (10 July 1892 in Amsterdam – 19 April 1987) was a Dutch secondary school physics teacher and author of the novel Sphereland.
