= Flatterland =

2001 novel by Ian Stewart

- UK bookcover
- Author: Ian Stewart
- Language: English
- Genre: Popular science, geometry
- Publisher: Perseus Publishing
- Publication date: 2001
- Publication place: United Kingdom
- Media type: Print, e-book
- Pages: 320
- ISBN: 978-0738206752

Flatterland is a 2001 book written by mathematician and science popularizer Ian Stewart about non-Euclidean geometry. It was written as a sequel to Flatland, an 1884 novel that discussed different dimensions.

== Plot summary ==
Almost 100 years after A. (which we find out stands for Albert) Square's adventures that were related in Flatland, his great-great-granddaughter, Victoria Line (Vikki), finds a copy of his book in her basement. This prompts her to invite a sphere from Spaceland to visit her, but instead she is visited by the "Space Hopper" (a character looking somewhat like the "Space Hopper" children's toy with a gigantic grin, horns and a spherical body). The Space Hopper, more than being able to move between Flatland and Spaceland, can travel to any space in the Mathiverse, a set of all imaginable worlds. After showing Vikki higher dimensions, he begins showing her more modern theories, such as fractional dimensions and dimensions with isolated points. Topology and hyperbolic geometry are also discussed, as well as the Projective "Plain" (complete with intersecting "lions") and the quantum level. Hopper and Victoria also visit the Domain of the Hawk King to discuss time travel and the theory of relativity.

=== How to Escape from a Black Hole ===
This is a diagram explaining how to escape from a black hole as mentioned in the book.

One of the examples given in Flatterland concerns how to escape from a black hole.

1. You are outside the black hole.
2. You have fallen into the black hole. A future version of yourself (4) appears and gives you a portable white hole. You use the portable white hole to escape the black hole.
3. Another future version of yourself (6) appears and gives you a time machine.
4. You go back into the black hole and give the past version of yourself (2) the portable white hole.
5. You use the time machine to go far enough into the future (i.e. millions of years) that the black hole has evaporated due to Hawking radiation.
6. You then travel back in time and give the past version of yourself (3) the time machine.
7. You are now outside of the black hole.

The dashed red line indicates the path of the portable white hole (clockwise). The dashed blue line indicates the path of the time machine (counterclockwise). Movement from the bottom towards the top generally indicates movement forward in time (not to scale) and vice versa.

== Real-world references ==
Ian Stewart often includes puns and topical references in his popular writing, and Flatterland is no exception.

- The heroine's name, Victoria Line, and her mother's, Jubilee Line, are both lines on the London Underground.
- Her great-great-grandfather's name is the fictional Albert Square in London, from the BBC soap opera EastEnders. Her father's name, Grosvenor Square, is a square situated in the Mayfair district of London.
- Hawk King is a simple pun on the surname of the famous astrophysicist Stephen Hawking, whose research includes the Theory of Relativity and Hawking radiation.
- Vikki, while travelling in the Topological Dimension, also meets a one-sided cow named Moobius (derived from the Möbius strip) who sells her milk in Klein bottles (the strip and the bottle both being one-sided topological figures).
- The Doughmouse, the Harsh Mare, and the Mud Hutter are the counterparts in Topologica (the rubber-sheet continent) of Carroll's Dormouse, March Hare, and Mad Hatter, respectively. The Doughmouse works with a dough tea set, dough being flexible.

== Editions ==
- ISBN 0-333-78312-3 Original hardback from Macmillan
- ISBN 0-7382-0442-0 Hardback edition by Perseus
- ISBN 0-7382-0675-X Paperback edition by Perseus
- ISBN 0-330-39377-4 Mass-market edition by Pan
