= Sieveking =

Sieveking is a surname. Notable people with the surname include:

- Alejandro Sieveking (1934–2020), Chilean playwright, theatre director and actor
- Amalie Sieveking (1794–1859), German philanthropist and social activist
- Edward Henry Sieveking (1816–1904), British physician
- Gale Sieveking (1925–2007), British archaeologist
- Georg Heinrich Sieveking (1751–1799), German merchant and follower of the Enlightenment
- Isabel Giberne Sieveking (1857–1936), British suffragette, historian and writer
- Karl Sieveking (1787–1847), Syndicus of Hamburg, diplomat, politician, patron of the arts and philanthropist
- Kurt Sieveking (1897–1986), German politician
- Lance Sieveking (1896–1972), British writer and radio and television producer
- Martinus Sieveking (1867–1950), Dutch virtuoso pianist, composer, teacher and inventor
- Paul Sieveking (born 1949), British journalist and former magazine editor
- Daniel Sieveke (born 1976) German Politician
- Sieveking section of Hamburg
