= Giberne =

Giberne is a surname. Notable people with the surname include:

- Agnes Giberne (1845–1939), British novelist and scientific writer
- Edgar Giberne (1850–1889), English artist and illustrator
- Isabel Giberne Sieveking (c. 1857 –1936), British suffragette, historian and writer
- Maria Giberne (1802−1885), French-English artist
