= Edgar Giberne =

English artist and illustrator

- Born: 24 June 1850; Epsom, Surrey, UK
- Died: 21 September 1889 (aged 39); Woodcote Park, Epsom, Surrey, UK
- Occupations: Artist and illustrator
- Years active: 1872–1889
- Known for: Sporting scenes
- Relatives: Isabel Giberne Sieveking (sister)

Edgar Giberne (24 June 1850 – 21 September 1889) was an English artist and illustrator from a notable Huguenot family. His output was limited to some extent by his short life. He was also a keen cricketer.

== Biography ==
Giberne was born in Epsom, Surrey, England, on 24 June 1850, and was baptised on 25 July that year at St. Martin's in Epsom. His father was George Giberne, who had served as a judge Supreme Court of Judicature, Bombay in the Indian Civil Service. (Note: He travelled to India in 1817, but his health suffered in an earthquake in 1820. He returned to India in 1825 and served there until March 1843 when he retired from the service. Whatever he did in India it seems to have paid well as his estate was worth almost £45,000 on his death in 1876.) Giberne's ancestors were Huguenots from Languedoc in France where the "de Gibernes" lived in Chateau de Gibertain. George Giberne was from a large family. He had eight sisters and four brothers. (Note: One of Giberne's aunts was the artist and notable convert to Roman Catholicism Maria Rosina Giberne (1802−1885)) His cousin Agnes Giberne was a prolific author of juvenile fiction and of works popularising science. Three of his brothers also served in India.

Giberne's mother was Maria Smith the second daughter of surgeon John Sim Smith. She was twenty-five years younger than her husband. The couple were married in Reigate on 20 July 1846. (Note: The couple had four children: Evelyn Giberne (7 June 1847 – 28 February 1932), who never married.; Harold Giberne, (9 October 1848 – buried 12 November 1848), who died in infancy.; Edward Giberne, the subject of this article; Isabel Giberne (6 October 1857 – 30 March 1936) who became a writer and married timber importer Edward Gustavus in Epsom on 25 April 1891. Their third son was Lance Sieveking, a writer and pioneering BBC producer.)

Giberne was a prodigious artist as a child. He entered Rugby, in August 1864, where he was placed in C. B. Hutchinson's House in Barby Road. (Note: Giberne attended the dinner in 1885, to mark C. B. Hutchinson's retirement.) In Rugby he showed "a remarkable taste and facility for drawing".

Giberne was a keen cricketer and played for Epsom in 1876, scoring 21 runs against Deddington. He also played for Espom in 1877, when he scored four runs against the Private Banks team, and again in 1878 when he scored 12 runs against Wimbledon. He played for the Old Rugbeians against the school's second eleven and scored no runs in the first innings before being bowled by schoolboy J. D. Yates. He fared little better in the second innings, scoring 1 run before being bowled by schoolboy T. L Lomax.

In August 1878, He played for the Incogniti, a cricket team without any home grounds, in their two-day match against the Gentlemen of Herts at Moor Park, the seat of Lord Ebury on 26 and 27 July 1878, scoring 16 runs and one catch on the first day, and 9 runs on the second. He continued to play for the Incogniti, and batted for them in matches against Oatlands, Bury and West Suffolk, and Middleton, in 1879. He remained a fixture on the Incogniti until his death, and served for a while as a member of the committee of the club.

In the 1889 season the Incogniti played 47 matches with 26 wins, 8 losses, and 13 draws. Giberne had 14 innings, had never been "not out", and scored 182 runs, an average of 13 runs per inning, with a max score of 39 runs. As a team, they scored nearly 14 runs per wicket on average. He was a batsman rather than a bowler and bowling averages were not given as he had bowled in less than four innings, and probably in none, as no records show him bowling out opponents.

Giberne married Caroline Alexandra Buller, the daughter of Lt. Col. James Hornby Buller in the Royal Bodyguard, on 20 February 1884 at the Parish Church in Epsom, Surrey, England. The couple had one child, Harold Buller Giberne (6 February 1885 – 8 April 1965) who became a farmer. (Note: Caroline remarried nearly five years after Giberne's death, to George Kendall Hext.)

Giberne had a studio at his home at 35 Kensington Square. He held a well received private exhibition there in the summer of 1889.

The Meteor states that Giberne caught cold in September 1889, while out shooting, and passed away four days later. However his death certificate shows that he suffered not from a cold, but from acute peritonitis, and died at his mother's house at Woodcote Park, Epsom on 21 September 1889. He was buried at Epsom Cemetery on 25 September 1889. His estate was valued at £2,043 13s. 1d., and his wife was sole executrix.

Three months after his death, the Auctioneers Christie, Manson, and Woods advertised an auction of the collection of paintings and water-colour drawings of the late James Blake which included 20 Water-colour Drawings and Pictures of the late Edgar Giberne. The auction took place on Saturday 14 December 1889.

When St. Martin's church in Epsom was extended in 1922, the new east window was dedicated to Edgar and three of his Buller relatives by marriage.

== Works ==
Graves stated that Giberne's speciality was in domestic scenes, The Dictionary of Victorian Painters states that he painted figurative and genre subjects, the Dictionary of British Artists calls him a landscape painter, and The Meteor noted that he was especially fond of painting animals.

Edgar exhibited at the Royal Academy four times between 1877 and 1879. (Note: The works he exhibited at the Royal Academy were: 1876. No. 818 Parson Chowne; from Blackmore's "Maid of Sker."; 1877. No. 129 Little Miss Moffet.; 1877. No. 740 Whistle and I'll come to you, my lad.; 1878. No. 666 The pond on the green.) The Meteor, in his obituary, stated that the works he exhibited at the academy proved him to be an artist of considerable promise. Graves shows him as exhibition only at the Royal Academy up to 1880 in the five principle venues in London. (Note: These venues were: The Society of Artists (1761–1791), The Free Society of Artists (1761–1783), the Royal Academy, the British Institution for Promoting the Fine Arts in the United Kingdom (1805–1867), and Suffolk Street (later better known as the Royal Society of British Artists). Of these five, three were defunct before Giberne began exhibiting.) The Dictionary of British Artists show Giberne as exhibiting as follows from 1880:

- 12 works at the Dudley Gallery and New Dudley Gallery
- Two works at the Walker Art Gallery, Liverpool
- One work at the Royal Society of British Artists (Note: While the Dictionary of British Artists shows him as exhibition only one work at the Royal Society of British Artists from 1880, and Graves show with no pieces at the venue up to 1980, The Dictionary of Victorian Painters shows him as exhibiting three works at the venue between 1875 and 1885.)
- Three works at the Royal Institute of Painters in Water Colours (Note: One of these was presumably Who is Sylvia? which "really caught the fancy" of Edward Aveling when he visited the Royal Institute of Painters in Water Colours Exhibition in 1885 because it was "so pretty and graceful".)
- One work at the Royal Institute of Oil Painters.

The Leeds Mercury said that of Giberne's "At Bay", which showed a "stag, which looks as if it had had a hard day over Exmoor, sheltering under a wooden bridge. The attitude of the poor driven creature, and the exultant rush of the hounds as they seem to recognise that the pursuit is over, are capitally rendered." Several of his paintings appeared on postcards by J Salmon Ltd.

Giberne worked as an illustrator, and had many illustrations in the illustrated journals. Houfe recorded that he had illustrations in the Illustrated London News.

Giberne illustrated a small number of books. The following list of works has developed largely from a search on the Jisc Library Hub Discover database. (Note: The Jisc Library Hub Discover brings together the catalogues of 168 major UK and Irish libraries. Additional libraries are being added all the time, and the catalogue collates national, university, and research libraries.). Where necessary, missing details such as page counts and publisher's names have been filled in by searches on WorldCat and on newspaper archives.

Books illustrated by Giberne
Ser	Year	Author	Title	Publisher	Pages	Notes
1	1878	George Whyte-Melville	Riding Recollections (fifth Edition)	Chapman & Hall, London	viii, 251 p., (8º)	(Note: Available from the Biodiversity Library. The 1898 edition was illustrated by Hugh Thomson with 12 illustrations including a colour frontispiece. While the list of publications by George Whyte-Melville in the 1898 edition give 1875 as the date of publication of the book, the Pall Mall Gazette advertised the book in February 1878 as a "New Work by Major Whyte Melville.")
2	1884	Herman Charles Merivale	Binko's Blues. A tale for children of all growths	Chapman & Hall, London	xii, 207 p., (8º)	(Note: Available on-line at the Internet Archive.)
3	1887	J. W. Fortescue	Records of stag-hunting on Exmoor	Chapman & Hall, London	vii, 286 p., (8º)	(Note: The Morning Post said that one of the two features of the book that called for special commendation was "the admiral illustrations" by Giberne.)
4	1887	Agnes Giberne	Miss Con, or, All those Girls	J. Nisbet & Co, London	viii, 341 p., (8º)	
5	1888	R. M. Ballantyne	Blue lights : or Hot work in the Soudan. A tale of soldier life in several of its phases	J. Nisbet & Co, London	vii, 1, 425, 3 p., 6 ill., (8º)	(Note: Available on-line at the British Library.)
6	1889	James Moray Brown	Powder, Spur, and Spear. A sporting medley	Chapman & Hall, London	viii, 292 p., (8º)	
7	1889	Cassell & Co.	The rivers of Great Britain. Descriptive, historical, pictorial. Rivers of the east coast.	Cassell & Co., London	vii, 376 p., ill., 33 cm	(Note: Illustrated by Giberne and 20 other authors. Available on-line from the British Library.)

=== Example of book illustration by Giberne ===
Illustration by Edgar Giberne (1850–1889) for Binko's blues: a tale for children of all growths (Chapman and Hall, London, 1884) by Herman Charles Merivale. By courtesy of the Internet Archive.

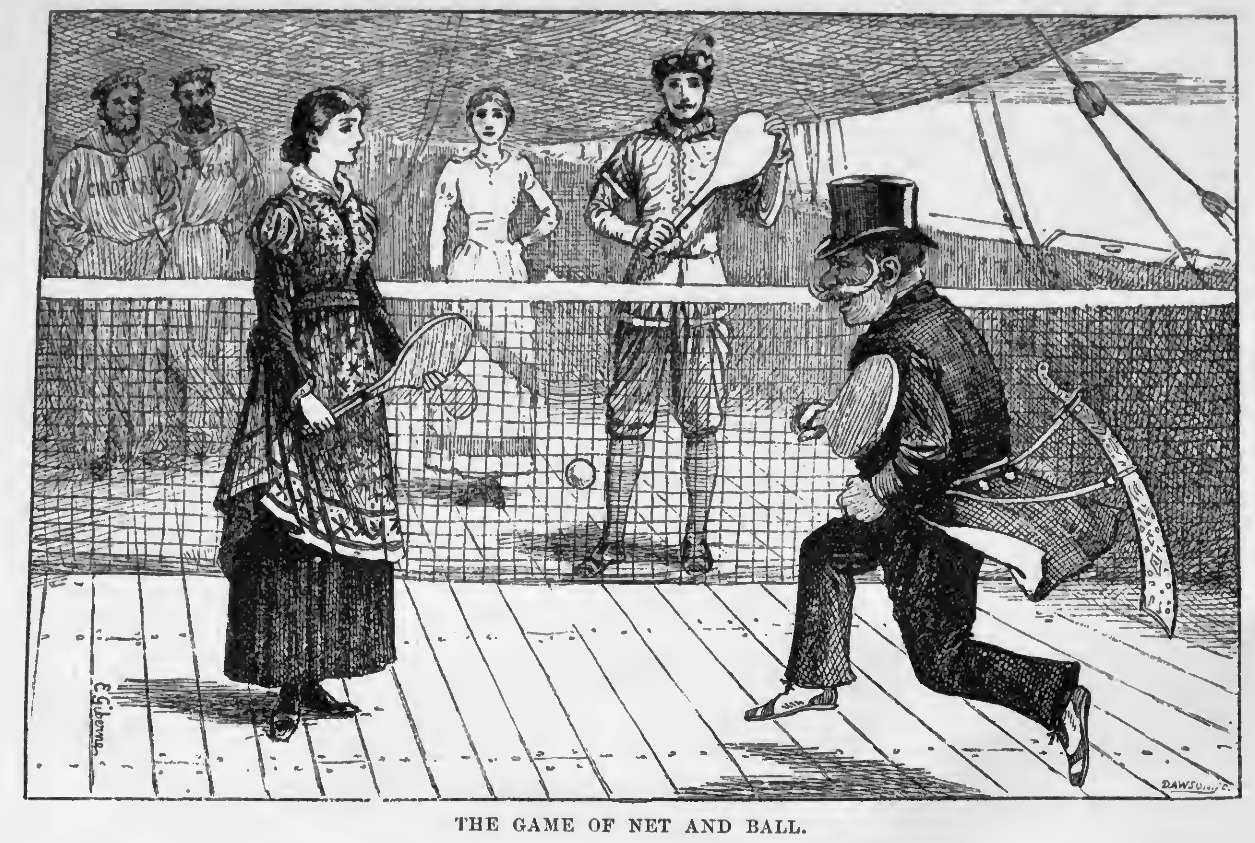
Frontispiece.jpg

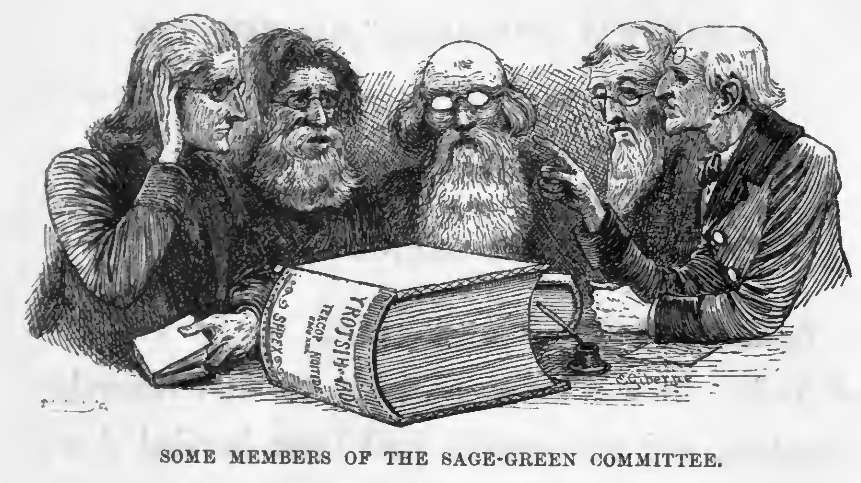
Page 002.jpg

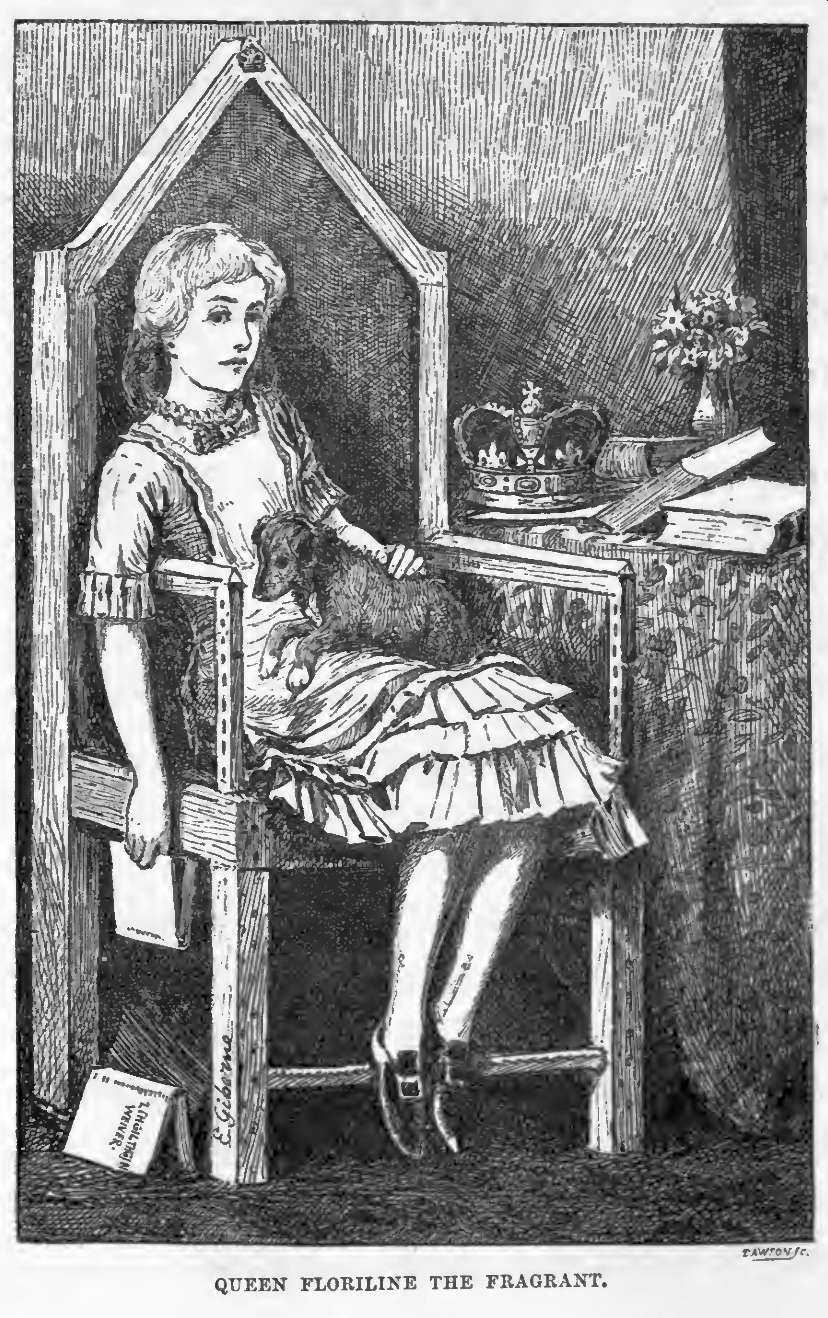
Page 047.jpg

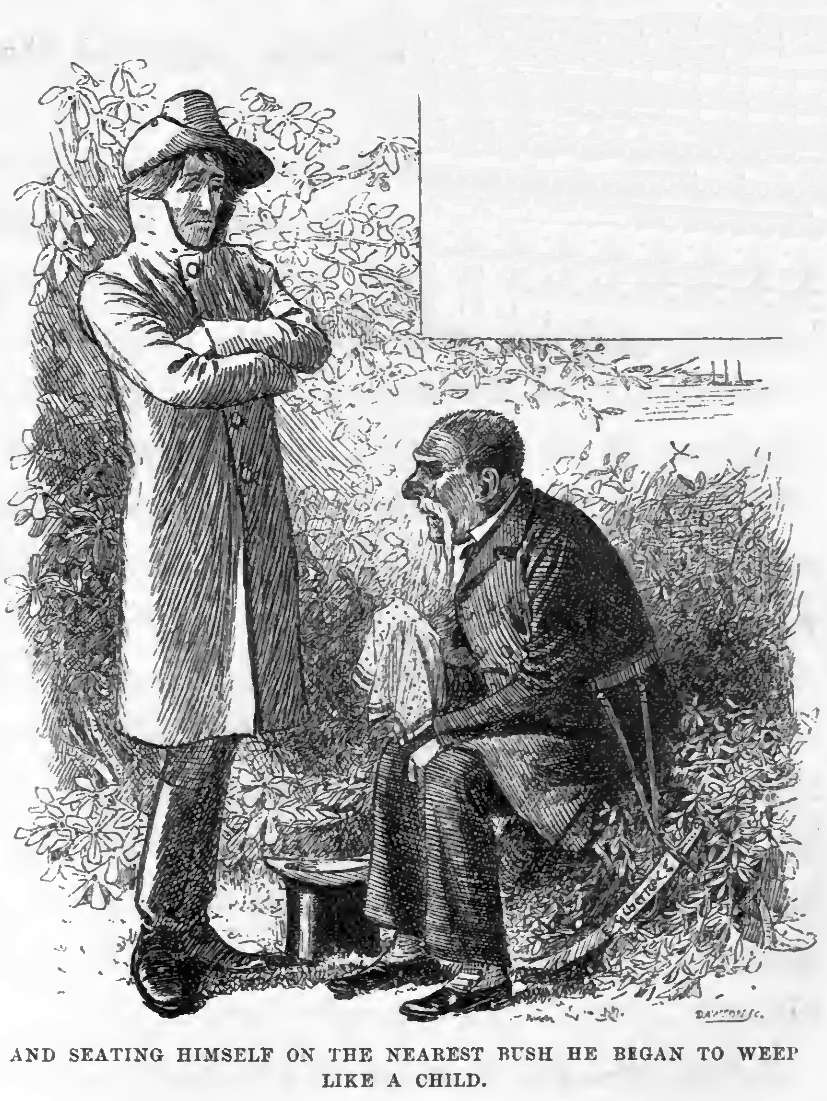
Page 075.jpg

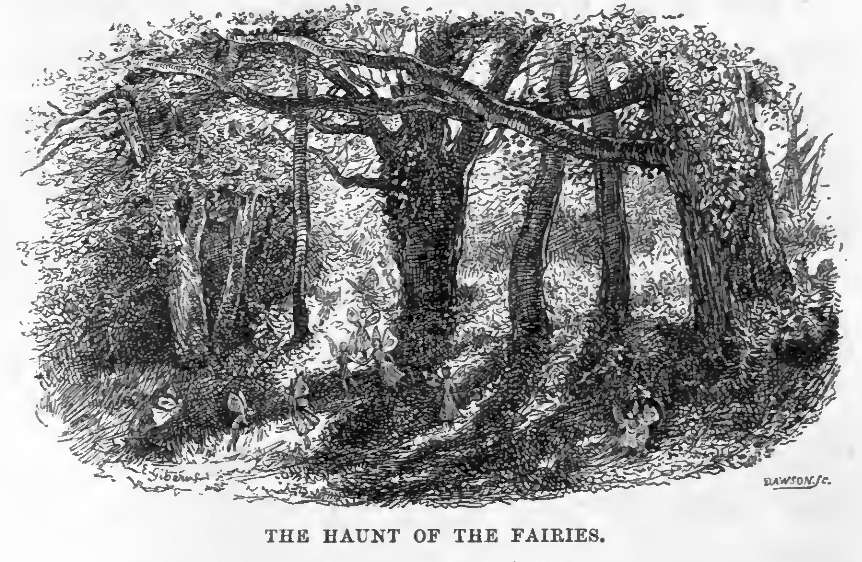
Page 077.jpg

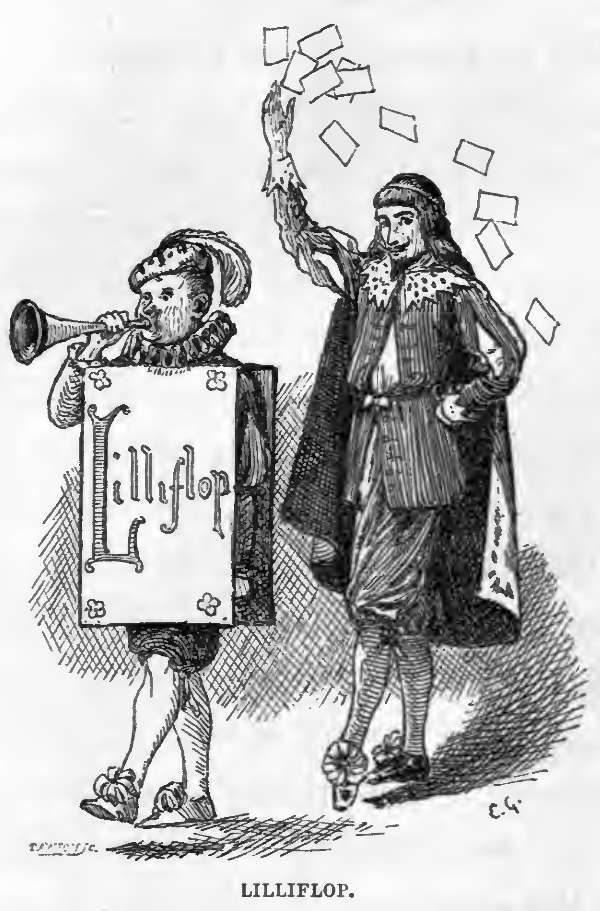
Page 083.jpg

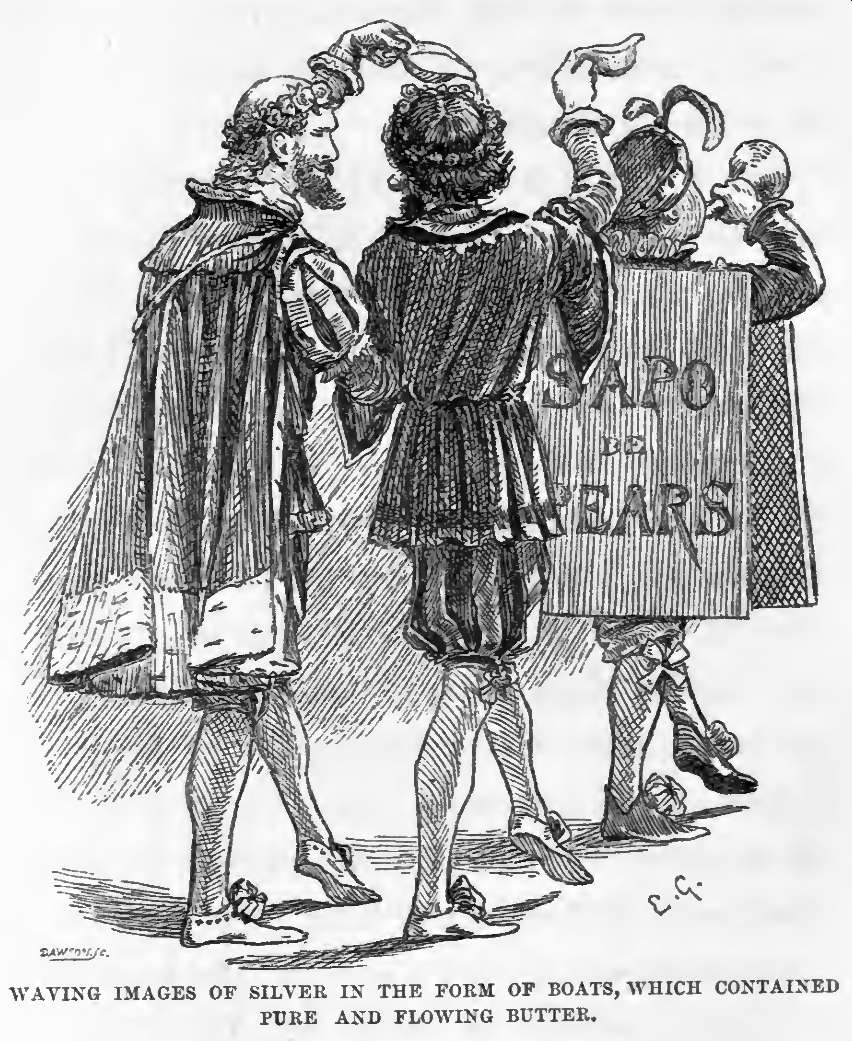
Page 085.jpg

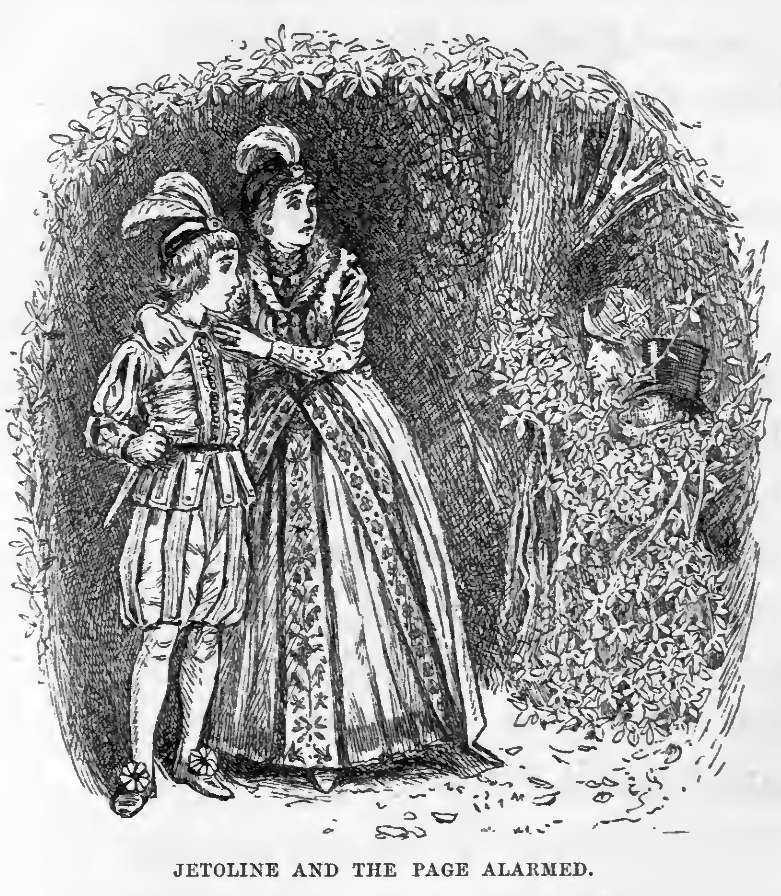
Page 089.jpg

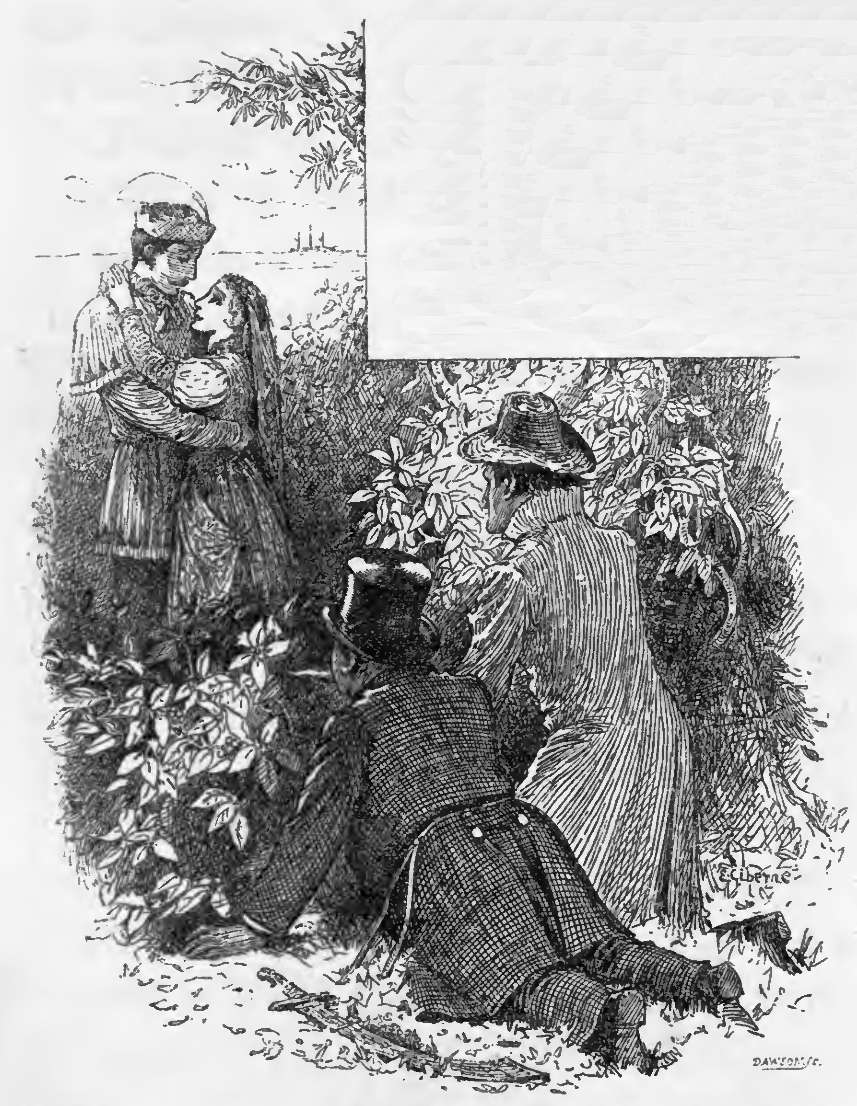
Page 100.jpg

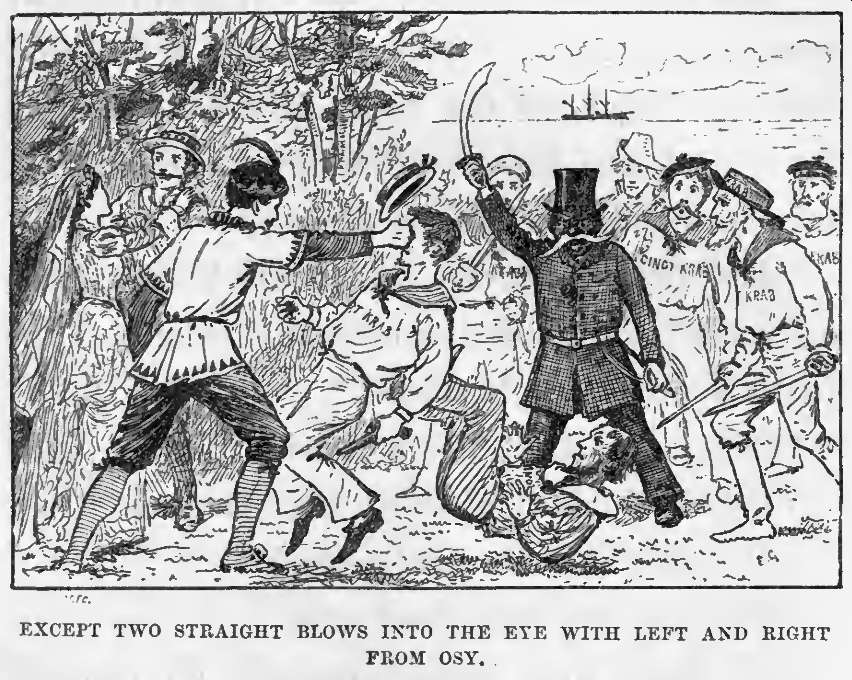
Page 104.jpg

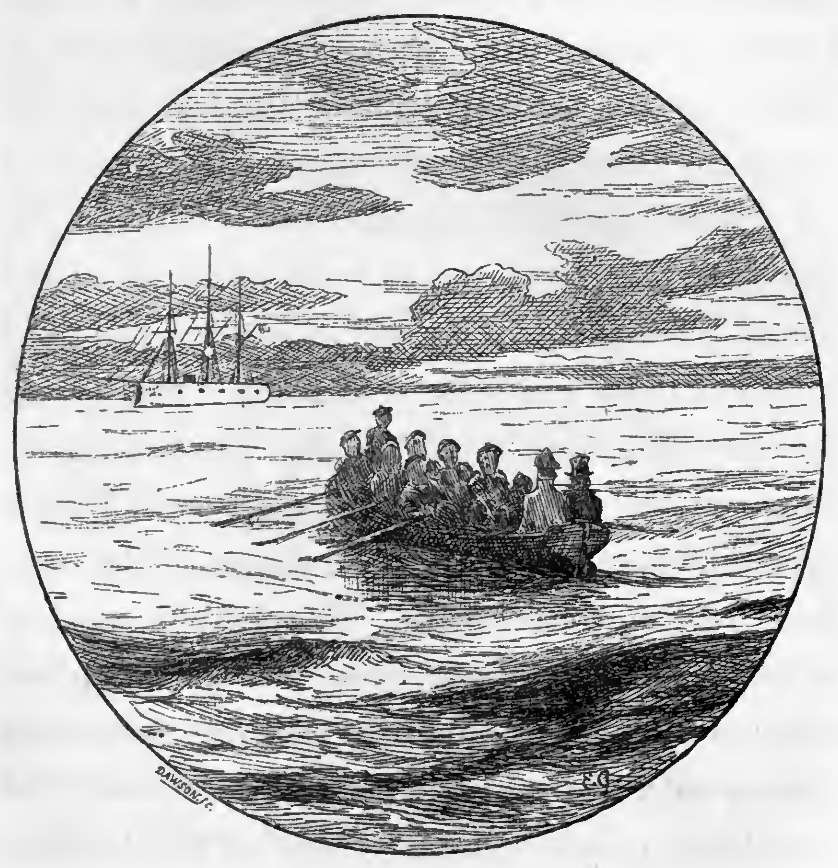
Page 106.jpg

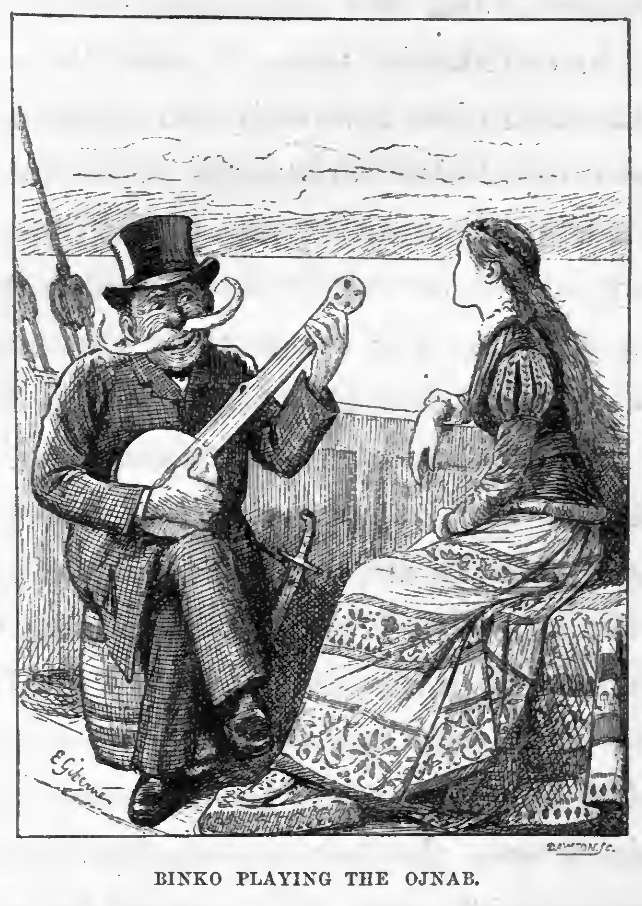
Page 117.jpg

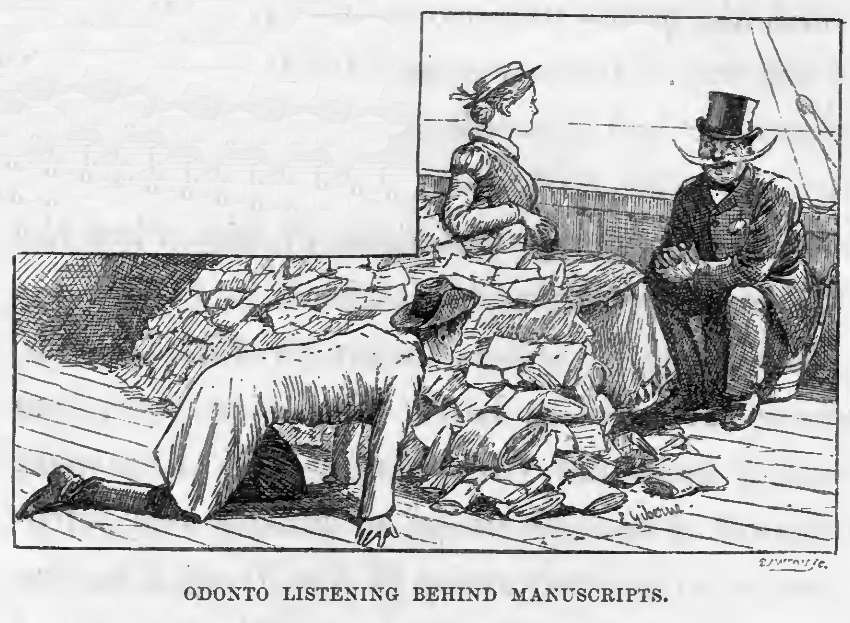
Page 120.jpg

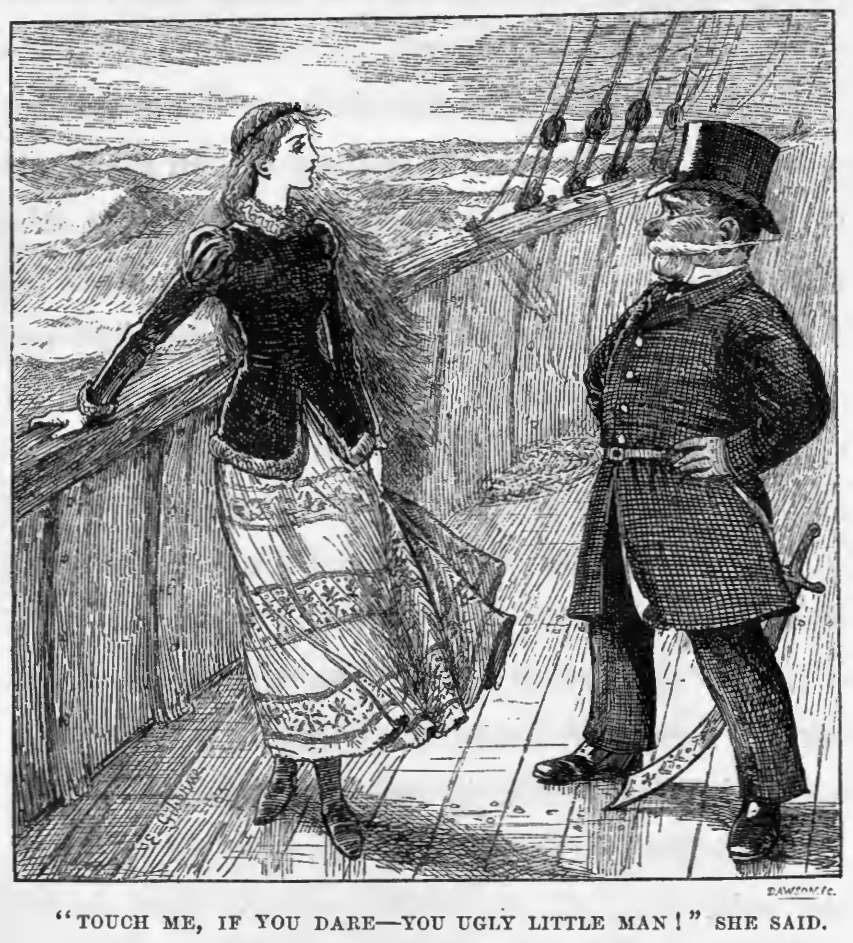
Page 148.jpg

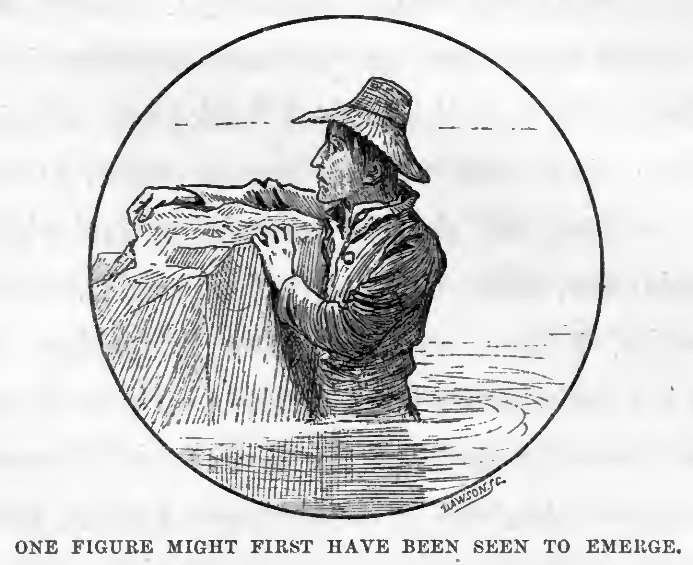
Page 158.jpg

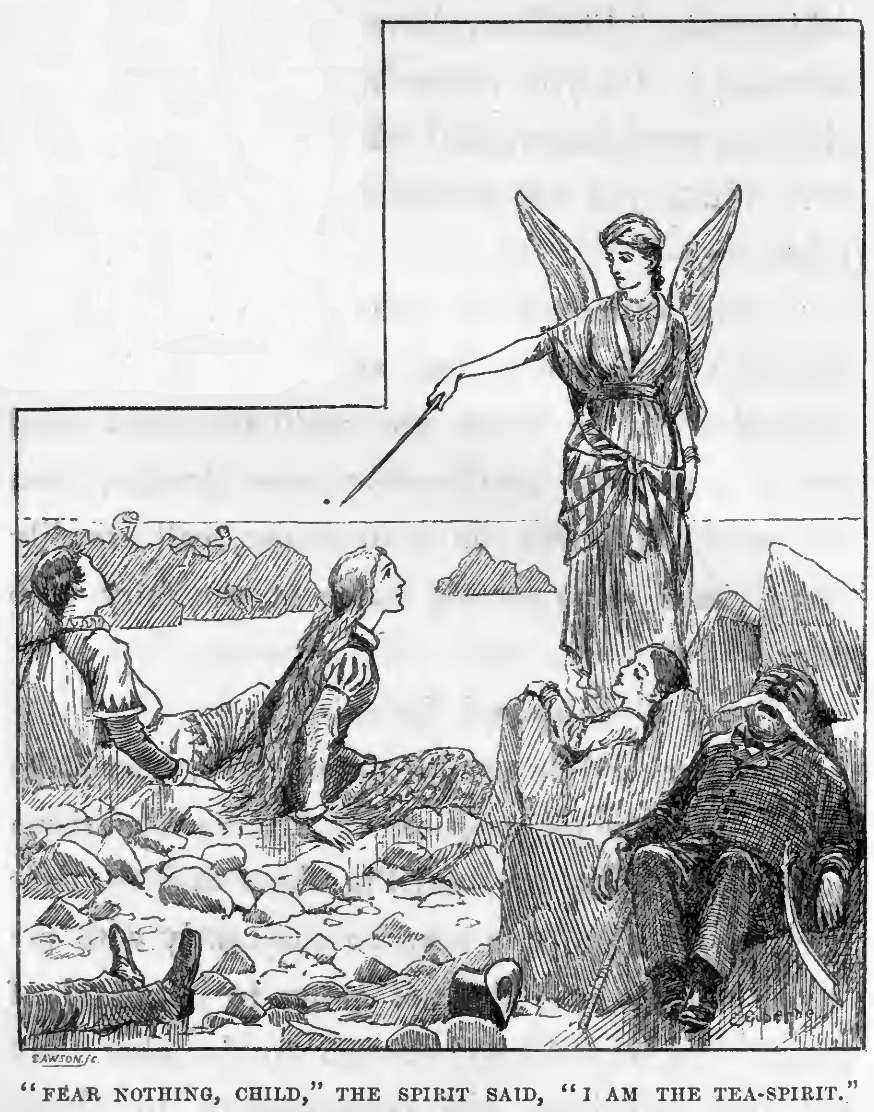
Page 176.jpg

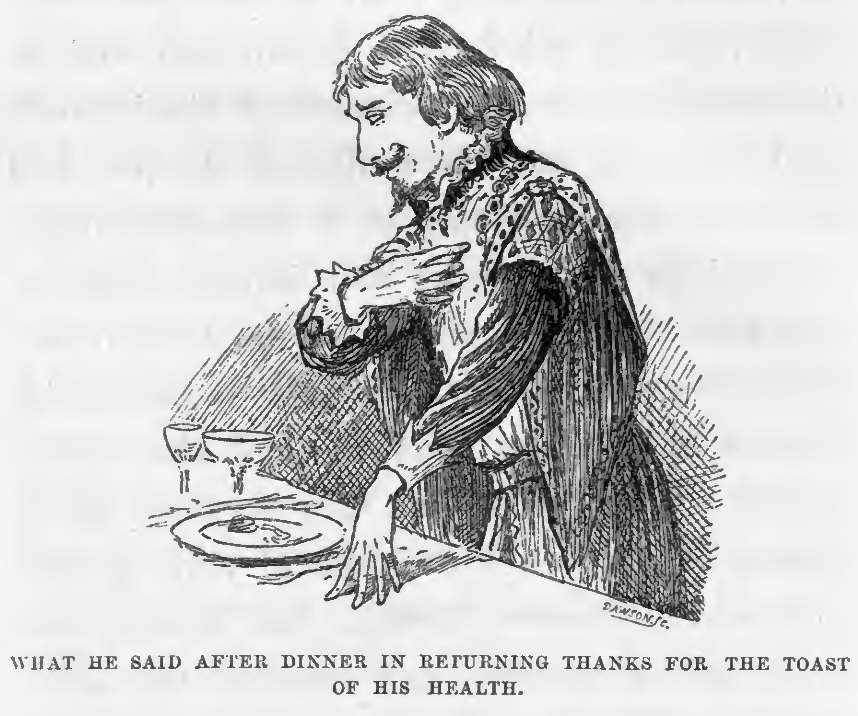
Page 186.jpg
