= Seeley, Service =

British publishing firm

- Status: Defunct (1979)
- Founded: 1744; 281 years ago
- Founder: Benton Seeley
- Country of origin: United Kingdom
- Headquarters location: London
- Publication types: Books
- Nonfiction topics: Religion, sport, travel, children's books, education, general

Seeley, Service was a British publishing firm. It was established in 1744 and ceased business more than two centuries later, in 1979. During most of the twentieth century the "well established" Seeley, Service was second only to Longman as Britain's oldest active publishing firm. In 1886 it was described by The Publishers' Circular as having a reputation for "taste and elegance".

== History of the firm ==
In 1744, Benton Seeley, a bookseller in Stowe, Buckinghamshire, published the first Seeley book: the Description of the Gardens of Lord Viscount Cobham, at Stow in Buckinghamshire. The gardens, now known as Stowe Gardens, were "much visited and publicized" and had "enormous influence on garden design, especially after experiments there in 'natural' gardening in the 1730s". The Seeley guide book went through several editions until a final edition of 1827 and did much to "spread the influence of Stowe as a model for the English landscape garden".

In the eighteenth and nineteenth centuries, the firm published books in various fields, including travel and religion (particularly on Protestant Christianity).

Robert Benton Seeley (1798–1886), a leading figure in the Church Influence Society, one of the founders of the Church Pastoral Aid Society and of the Society for Improving the Condition of the Labouring Classes, and a supporter of Shaftesbury's campaign for factory acts, operated the firm in the mid-19th century under the name of Seeley, Jackson and Halliday. His son was the historian and political essayist Sir John Robert Seeley.

In the final decades of the nineteenth century, Agnes Giberne's books of popular science were published by Seeley, Jackson, and Halliday and later by Seeley & Co., including Sun, Moon and Stars: Astronomy for Beginners (1879), which had sold 26,000 copies by 1903.

In 1911, the firm's offerings were described as "high-class works of art, religious, educational, and general".

In 1970, Seeley, Service merged with Leo Cooper Ltd., a firm that specialised in publishing "regimental histories, escape stories and war memoirs", to form Seeley, Service & Cooper, which went into receivership in 1979 and was acquired by Frederick Warne.

== Changes of name and address ==
In the 1790s, the firm published under the moniker of "T. N. Longman, L. B. Seeley", and in the first two decades of the nineteenth century as "L. B. Seeley and J. Hatchard" or as "J. Seeley". In the 1840s, the firm was publishing as "Seeley, Burnside, Seeley" and from the 1840s until the 1880s as "Seeley, Jackson & Halliday". From the 1890s, the firm published as "Seeley and Co.". From around 1912, the firm published under the name of "Seeley, Service & Co. Limited".

In 1849 the firm's office was located at Fleet Street, and Hanover Street, London. In the 1880s and 1890s the office was in Essex Street, Strand, from 1910 at 12 Russell Street, and in 1927 at 126 Shaftsbury Avenue, London.

== Flatland ==
Flatland: A Romance of Many Dimensions, a satirical science fiction novella by A Square (pseudonym of Edwin Abbott Abbott), was first published by Seeley & Co. in 1884. It received a number of reviews but was not a financial success. The novella was rediscovered in the 1920s after Albert Einstein's general theory of relativity was published and popularized the concept of the fourth dimension, which led in turn to an interest to the role of the fourth dimension in literature.

A letter to the editor of Nature on 12 February 1920 argued: "Some thirty or more years ago a little jeu d'esprit was written by Dr. Edwin Abbott entitled Flatland. At the time of its publication it did not attract as much attention as it deserved." In recent years, a number of adaptations and parodies of Flatland have appeared in film and in literature, including Flatland (2007 film) (2007) and Flatland: The Movie (2007).

== The Lonsdale Library ==
The Lonsdale Library of Sports, Games and Pastimes was series of sports books launched in 1929 under the editorship of the English peer and sportsman the 5th Earl of Lonsdale, and which featured "many notable contributors from their respective fields". Sir Theodore Cook helped plan the series before he died in 1928. Books in this series received high praise, such as The Game of Cricket, which The Field predicted would be the "standard work on cricket for some years to come".

== Other book series ==
- Beaufort Library Series
- "Children's Friend" Series
- The Christian's Family Library
- The Church Historians of England
- The Church Missionary Juvenile Instructor
- The Crown Library
- The Elzevir Library
- The English Scene
- "Events of Our Own Time" Series
- Events of our Time
- Heroes of the World Library
- The Illustrated Scarlet Library
- The Illuminated Series
- The Imperial Services Library
- The Library of Adventure
- The Library of Christian Biography
- The Library of Adventure
- The Library of Missions
- The Library of Romance
- Miniature Library of Devotion
- Missionary Library for Boys and Girls
- Miniature Portfolio Monographs
- Missionary Biographies
- Modern Sports Series
- The New Art Library
- The New Library
- The Olive Library
- The Pink Library
- The Prince's Library
- Portfolio Monographs on Artistic Subjects
- Remarkable Missionary Books
- Royal Library for Boys and Girls
- Russell Series for Boys and Girls
- Science for Children
- Science of To-day Series
- Seeley's Cheap School Books
- Seeley's First Lesson Books
- Seeley's Illustrated Pocket Library
- Seeley Service War Fiction series
- The Standard Library
- Studies in Modern Music
- Sunday Echoes in Weekday Hours
- Things Seen Series
- "Tottie's Treasure" Series
- Ullswater Library Series
- The Week-end Library
- Wonder Library
- A World Atlas of Military History
