= The Movement of the Free Spirit =

1986 book by Raoul Vaneigem

- Author: Raoul Vaneigem
- Original title: Le mouvement du Libre-Esprit
- Translator: Randall Cherry, Ian Patterson
- Language: French
- Publisher: Editions Ramsay (Original French); Zone Books (English Translation)
- Publication date: 1986
- Publication place: France
- Media type: Print
- Pages: 302 (1998 Zone Books edition)
- ISBN: 9780942299700

The Movement of the Free Spirit: General Considerations and Firsthand Testimony Concerning Some Brief Flowerings of Life in the Middle Ages, the Renaissance and, Incidentally, Our Own Time (French: Le mouvement du Libre-Esprit) is a 1986 book by former Situationist International (SI) member Raoul Vaneigem published in English in 1998 by Zone Books.

== Summary ==
Vaneigem documents a number of radical heretical religious movements that took place in Europe between the twelfth and sixteenth centuries.

== See also ==
- Brethren of the Free Spirit
