= Paul Sieveking =

British journalist and editor (born 1949)

Paul R.A. De Giberne Sieveking (born 1949) is a British journalist and former magazine editor.

Until 2002, Sieveking was co-editor of the magazine The Fortean Times with its founder Bob Rickard. He joined the UK-based "Journal of the Unexplained" in 1978. His father, Lancelot "Lance" De Giberne Sieveking was an early BBC radio and television drama pioneer, and his half-brother Gale De Giberne Sieveking was an archaeologist.

== Biography ==
Sieveking was born in London in 1949, the son of writer/broadcaster/producer Lance Sieveking. He attended Jesus College, Cambridge, where he read anthropology, graduating in 1971.

He subsequently produced the first English translation (with John Fullerton) of Raoul Vaneigem's The Revolution of Everyday Life, which was published by Practical Paradise Publications in 1975.

== Fortean Times ==
Sieveking was introduced to FT-founder Bob Rickard by mutual friend Ion Will in 1978, some five years and more than 25 issues after it was first self-published as The News in 1973, before becoming Fortean Times in 1976. Joining the team as co-associate editor (with Steve Moore) under Rickard. He took over full editorial duties for the four quarterly issues of 1984-1985 (#43-46), to give Rickard a chance to "revitalize", (which he did). Sieveking then joined Rickard as co-editor for the next 16–17 years, until editorship was passed to David Sutton in 2002.

Sieveking was the Strange Days news editor until the end of 2019, but still plays a major role for FT, writing the Archaeology column, compiling the Extra Extra section, and editing the Letters pages. He also acts as quality-control proof-reader and contributes occasional feature articles.

== Other ==
Whilst an undergraduate at Cambridge, Sieveking co-edited with the artist Antony Gormley the little magazine Origo 3 (circa 1970, sole edition), which featured some of the artist's first published work. Sieveking has produced occasional articles for online magazine NthPosition, and is described by them as having "been a student of extreme human behaviour since the glory days of the Situationists."

== Bibliography ==
=== Fortean Times collected editions ===
- Yesterday's News Tomorrow: Fortean Times Issues 1-15, (As editor, collected ed.) John Brown Publishing, 1992, paperback, ISBN 1-870870-26-3
- Diary of a Mad Planet: Fortean Times Issues 16-25, (As editor, collected ed.) John Brown Publishing Ltd, 1995, paperback, ISBN 1-870021-25-8
- Seeing Out the Seventies: Fortean Times Issues 26-30, (As editor, collected ed.) John Brown Publishing Ltd, 1992, paperback, ISBN 1-870021-20-7
- Gateways to Mystery: Fortean Times Issues 31-36, (As editor, collected ed.) John Brown Publishing Ltd, 1993, paperback, ISBN 1-870870-37-9
- Heaven's Reprimands: Fortean Times Issues 37-41, (As editor, collected ed.) John Brown Publishing Ltd, 1994, paperback, ISBN 1-870870-52-2
- If Pigs Could Fly: Fortean Times Issues 42-46, (As editor, original magazines & collected ed.) John Brown Publishing Ltd, 1994, paperback, ISBN 1-870870-47-6
- Fishy Yarns: Fortean Times Issues 47-51, (As co-editor, original magazines & collected ed.) John Brown Publishing Ltd, 1994, hardback, ISBN 1-870870-48-4
- Bonfire of the Oddities: Fortean Times Issues 52-56, (As co-editor, original magazines & collected ed.) John Brown Publishing Ltd, 1995, paperback, ISBN 1-870870-61-1
- Strange Attractors: Fortean Times Issues 57-62, (As co-editor, original magazines & collected ed.) John Brown Publishing Ltd, 1996, paperback, ISBN 1-870870-73-5
- Plumber from Lhasa: Fortean Times Issues 63-67, (As co-editor, original magazines & collected ed.) John Brown Publishing Ltd, 1996, paperback, ISBN 1-870870-79-4
- Memories of Hell: Fortean Times Issues 68-72, (As co-editor, original magazines & collected ed.) John Brown Publishing Ltd, 1997, paperback, ISBN 1-870870-90-5
- Mouthful of Mysteries: Fortean Times Issues 73-77, (As co-editor, original magazines & collected ed.) John Brown Publishing Ltd, 1998, paperback, ISBN 1-870870-66-2
- Snakes Alive!: Fortean Times Issues 93-97, (As co-editor, original magazines & collected ed.) John Brown Publishing Ltd, 1998, paperback, ISBN 1-902212-04-5

=== Other Fortean titles ===
(As editor/compiler, unless stated.)

- Man Bites Man: The Scrapbook of an English Eccentric - George Ives, Jay Landesman 1980; Penguin Books, 1981 ISBN 0-14-005960-1
- Fortean Times 1993 Diary, John Brown Publishing Ltd, 1992, hardback, ISBN 1-870870-24-7
- The Fortean Times Book of More Strange Deaths, John Brown Publishing Ltd, 1998, paperback, ISBN 1-902212-02-9
- The Fortean Times Book of Medical Mayhem, (with Ian Stuart Simmons) John Brown Publishing Ltd, 1999, paperback, ISBN 1-902212-19-3
