= The Revolution of Everyday Life =

1967 French-language political treatise by Raoul Vaneigem

- Cover of the Gallimard edition
- Author: Raoul Vaneigem
- Original title: Traité de savoir-vivre à l’usage des jeunes générations
- Translator: Donald Nicholson-Smith
- Language: French
- Published: 1967 (Gallimard, in French); 1972 (Practical Paradise Publications, in English)
- Publication place: France
- Media type: Print (Hardcover, Paperback)
- Pages: 216 (Left Bank Books and Rebel Press edition)
- ISBN: 0-946061-01-7 (UK); ISBN 0-939306-06-9 (US)

The Revolution of Everyday Life (French: Traité de savoir-vivre à l’usage des jeunes générations) is a 1967 book by Raoul Vaneigem, Belgian author and onetime member of the Situationist International (1961–1970). The original title literally translates as, Treatise on How To Live for the Younger Generations. John Fullerton and Paul Sieveking chose the title under which the work appears in English.

== Summary ==
Vaneigem takes the field of "everyday life" as the ground upon which communication and participation can occur, or, as is more commonly the case, be perverted and abstracted into pseudo-forms. He considers that direct, unmediated communication between "qualitative subjects" is the 'end' to which human history tends – a state of affairs still frustrated by the perpetuation of capitalist modes of relation and to be "called forward" through the construction of situations. Under these prevailing conditions, people are still manipulated as docile "objects" and without the "qualitative richness" which comes from asserting their irreducible individuality – it is toward creating life lived in the first person that situations must be "built". So to speak, it is the humiliation of being but a "thing" for others that is responsible for all the ills Vaneigem equates with modern city life – isolation, humiliation, miscommunication – and to reach freedom, individuals have to tend toward creating new roles that flout stereotyped conventions.

== Influence ==
The Revolution of Everyday Life was, along with Guy Debord’s The Society of the Spectacle (1967), one of the most significant works written by members of the Situationist International (1957–1972).

== See also ==
- Anarchism
- Council communism
- May '68
