= Consume, be silent, die =

Phrase critiquing consumer culture

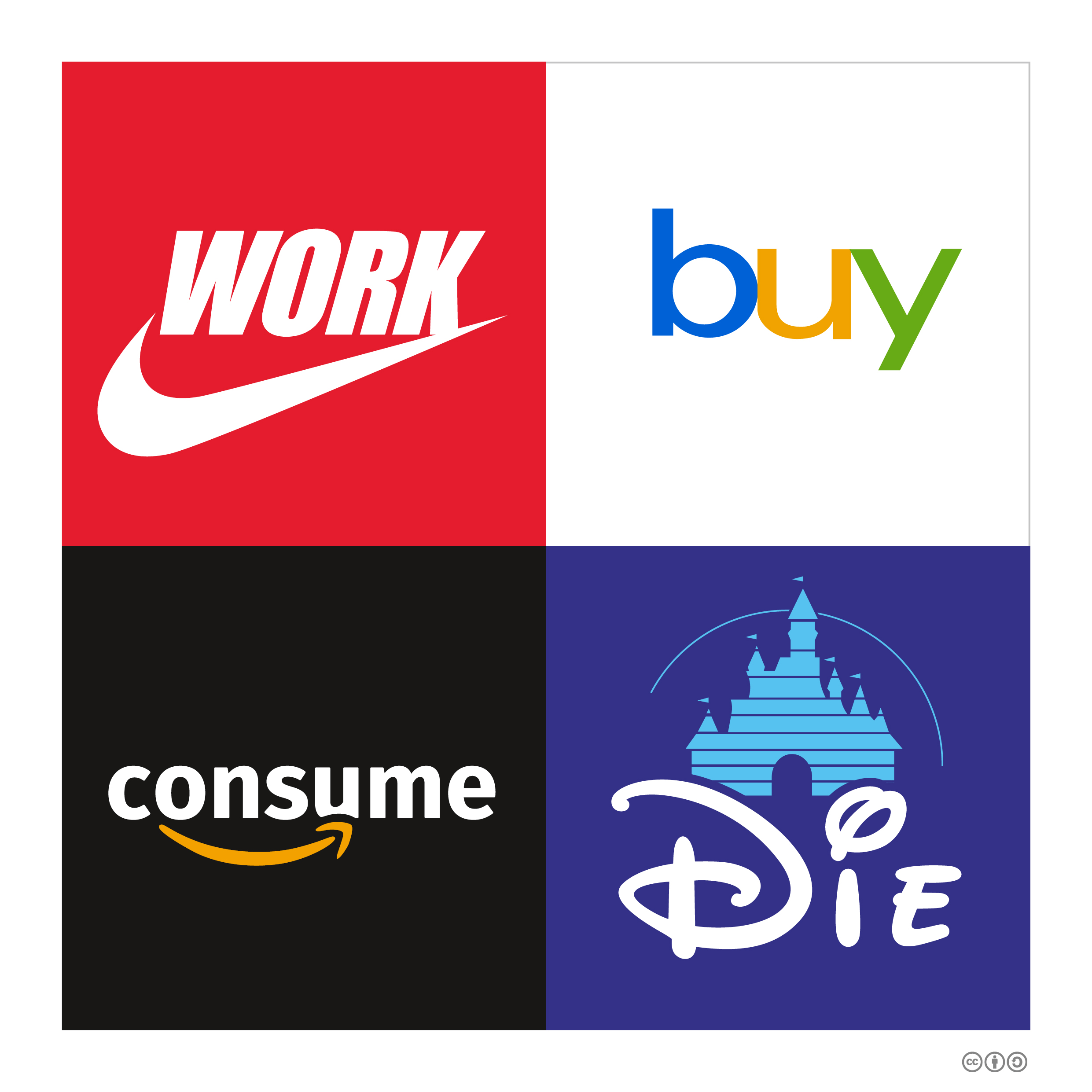
Work Buy Consume Die

The phrase "Consume, be silent, die" embodies a critique of consumer culture, capturing what Raoul Vaneigem called "the poverty of abundance". Variants include "work, consume, be silent, die" and "work, buy, consume, die". The phrase can be traced back to 1970s environmental protests but regained prominence during the Occupy Wall Street protests of 2011.

== Origins and popular culture ==
Some claim the phrase's origin is in 1970s graffiti. One of Benny Zable's GreeDozer costumes includes the phrase. Early photos of this costume are undated, but Hutton and Connors (1999, p. 153) report sightings in 1979. It was also familiar to train passengers in Sydney as graffiti on the wall of a tunnel approaching Central Station as early as 1972.

- The Belgian philosopher Raoul Vaneigem expressed a closely related sentiment in his 1967 book The Revolution of Everyday Life: "Work to survive, survive by consuming, survive to consume; the hellish cycle is complete."
- The poetry journal Moria published a photograph by the photographer Ana Viviane Minorelli of the phrase as graffiti.
- The punk band CCCP sang in their 1986 song Morire the words Produci, consuma, crepa (Italian for "Produce, Consume, Die").
- A spray-painted stencil showing the phrase "Be Silent, Consume, Die" inside the screen of a television appeared on the sidewalks of San Francisco, California in the late 1980's, as noted decades later in an opinion piece in the Tehran Times.
- The punk band "Man Will Destroy Himself" have an album entitled Consume...Be Silent...Die....
- The Summer Camp Riot album Mole Patrol includes the song "Work Buy Consume Die (Ring The Frickin Bell Already)".
