= Mr. Ledbetter's Vacation =

- Short story by H. G. Wells
- Country: United Kingdom
- Genre: Science fiction

Publication

"Mr. Ledbetter's Vacation" (sometimes rendered "Leadbetter") is a short story written by H. G. Wells in 1894. The story deals with the internal human conflict between rationality and the irrational fear of the unknown.

== Publication ==
"Mr. Ledbetter's Vacation" was published in The Strand Magazine Vol. XVI: July - December 1898 (London: George Newnes Limited, 1898). That volume also contained an article on "The Boyhood of Lewis Carroll," recently deceased'; short stories by Sir Arthur Conan Doyle; "The Larrakin of Diamond Creek" by A. J. Raffles-author E. W. Hornung and stories/articles by W. W. Jacobs, L. T. Meade and others.

== Plot summary ==
"Mr. Leadbetter is in holy orders, and for more years than he cares to remember has led a virtuous, worthwhile and very dull life. After drinking a little more than is good for him whilst on holiday, he rashly decides to commit a crime. It has consequences he could never have imagined - he ends up on the other side of the world."

== Adaptations ==
Mr. Leadbetter's Vacation was adapted into a 30-minute BBC radio drama in the mid-1950s by Lance Sieveking. It was subsequently broadcast by NBC as part of their "Showcase" series, on 16 October 1954.
