= Gale Sieveking =

British prehistoric archaeologist

Gale de Giberne Sieveking (26 August 1925 – 2 June 2007) was a British prehistoric archaeologist, best known for his work on flint and flint mines, particularly at sites such as Grimes Graves. He "played... an important part in the development of archaeology as a discipline" and particularly in the understanding of the prehistoric period. He was the son of BBC-pioneer Lancelot "Lance" De Giberne Sieveking, and half-brother to Fortean-writer Paul Sieveking.

== Biography ==
Gale de Giberne Sieveking was born on 26 August 1925 in Cagnes-sur-Mer in the Alpes Maritimes, France. Although technically entitled, aged 17, "to choose between French and British nationality" due to his birthplace, in 1942 he had little choice "and, with certain regrets... relinquished his French nationality."

After leaving school, Sieveking "joined the Fleet Air Arm" training and positioned in places such as Canada, Colombo and Malta. He attended King's College, Cambridge, and as an ex-serviceman was financed by the post-war government for two years out of the three-year course. He read History, but was soon "captivated by archaeology and in his final year he studied prehistory."

He was a PhD student under Grahame Clark (learning "prehistory on Clark's excavations at Star Carr in the early 1950s"), but "left this [his PhD] unfinished" when in 1952, he married Ann Paull (1931-2012), the elder daughter of Vivian Hearle Paull and Rachel Alice (his first wife, nee Merz), and "was in need of an income." He was "offered a post as Deputy Director of Museums in Malaya" and accepted in 1953.

== Excavations and museum posts ==
=== Malaya ===
Taking up his post in 1953, and despite finding that "[o]pportunities for travelling and exploring were limited" under the then-"state of emergency" declared five years previously "by the British colonial government... as a response to Communist insurgency" he managed to open three regional "museums in Malacca, Seremban and Kuala Kangsa." He carried out excavations in Malaysia throughout the 1950s, excavating sites from all periods, including "a seventeenth-century Portuguese fort in Johore Lama", "an early Indian trading post in the mangrove swamps near Taiping" and "an exceptional buried hoard of Ming porcelain," also in Johore which included "several bowls of imperial quality."

Most notable was the excavations at Gua Cha "a habitation site in a rock shelter on the Nengiri river in Kelantanin"/Kelantan. Gua Cha was initially located in 1935 by H. D. Noon, who had died during the war, with Sieveking then undertaking "the first systematic excavation of Gua Cha" (with Michael Tweedie of the Raffles Museum, Singapore). The dig uncovered "a slaughtering station for wild boar," "over 30 [human] remains... buried in two distinct time frames, the Hoabinhian [or Mesolithic] and the Neolithic," "the latter with jadeite bracelets, polished stone axes and pottery bowls containing a supply of small animals, presumably for sustenance in the next world." The dig was carried out under "military escort" as the local peoples were "suspected of supporting the insurgents with food and intelligence."

=== British Museum ===
Having spent three years in Malaya, the Sievekings (and two children) returned to England in 1956, where Gale joined the staff of the British Museum, becoming Deputy Keeper in the Department of Prehistoric and Romano-British Antiquities. Catherine Johns, writing in Salon says that during "the 1950s, he [Sieveking], Peter Lasko and David Wilson were great friends as young Assistant Keepers in the British and Medieval Department."

His "first research project was an analysis of Grand Pressigny flint", a "honey-coloured stone" found in France and traded in the Neolithic period, unusual for "being identifiable by its colour." Sieveking helped establish that all flint could be "identified by their trace elements," allowing the mapping of "the distribution of flints from different mines." He "dug at High Lodge, near Mildenhall, in Suffolk," a confusing site which caused geologists and archaeologists some vexation as "the chronological order of the flint tools discovered in the gravel and brickearth deposits apparently contradicts the geological succession."

In 1965–66, Sieveking joined Michael Kerney "for an expedition to Thailand" partly intended "to locate sites in the limestone massifs in the country's north and north-eastern provinces with Palaeolithic and earlier remains, sealed by stalagmite deposits, and thus datable using protactinium-thorium-uranium isotopic methods."

Sieveking also "dug further early sites, in the Thames valley at Ebbsfleet and Northfleet and at Creffield Road, Acton, and then, with a change in date, he reopened the Neolithic flint mines at Grimes Graves, in Norfolk."

Between 1972 and 1976, Sieveking and Ian Longworth joined forces "to re-examine the important Neolithic flint mines at Grimes Graves, Norfolk," located north of the town at Brandon, Suffolk. Longworth focused "on the rich Bronze Age deposits," while Sieveking looked at "the so-called "primitive" pits of the west fields, the flaking floor workshops in between them and the deep mines," using the British Museum Laboratory to help with "challenging projects" and unanswered questions. The re-examination of Grimes Graves mines underscored Sieveking's recognition of "the need for archaeological investigations to become more scientific and multidisciplinary." He sought the help of (among others) Professor Rory Mortimore (an engineering geologist), as well as the Dutch "Felder brothers" who had "expertise as traditional pick-and-shovel s" and "experience in opening the Rijckholt St Geertruid Neolithic Flint Mines near Maastricht in Limburg."

He "had many interests: music, painting, buildings [and] travelling abroad – particularly in France." He finally retired from his role as Deputy Keeper at the British Museum in 1985, and died in Suffolk aged 81 on 2 June 2007.

== Legacy ==
Perhaps his main contribution to archaeology was helping to establish that flint from different localities could be identified by trace elements. This made it possible to map the distribution from individual mines; for example axes from Grimes Graves in Norfolk (where he carried out extensive excavations) spread across England into France, while French flint travelled in the opposite direction. His excavation of a prehistoric lakeside settlement at High Lodge in West Suffolk in the 1960s occasioned a contest between archaeological orthodoxy and the geological succession: geology won.

== Selected bibliography ==
- The caves of France and northern Spain: a guide (with Ann Sieveking, his wife) (1962)
- Flint implements: an account of Stone Age techniques and cultures (3rd ed. 1968)
- Problems in economic and social archaeology (editor, with I. H. Longworth and K. E. Wilson (ed.s)) (1976)
- The scientific study of flint and chert: proceedings of the Fourth International Flint Symposium (editor with M.B. Hart (ed.)) (1986)
