= Agnes Giberne =

British author and astronomer

- Born: 19 November 1845; Belgaum, Bombay Presidency, British India
- Died: 20 August 1939 (aged 93); Eastbourne, East Sussex, England
- Other name: A. G.
- Occupations: Writer and scientist
- Years active: 1864–1930
- Known for: Popularising science and juvenile evangelical fiction
- Notable work: Sun, Moon, and Stars (1879)

Artist's impression of midnight on Saturn from Giberne's popular astronomy book Sun, Moon and Stars

Agnes Giberne (19 November 1845 – 20 August 1939) was a British novelist and scientific writer. Her fiction was typical of Victorian evangelical fiction with moral or religious themes for children. She also wrote books on science for young people, a handful of historical novels, and one well-regarded biography.

== Biography ==
Giberne was born in Belgaum, India, the daughter of Captain Charles Giberne of the Bengal Native Infantry and Lydia Mary Wilson. Her ancestors were Huguenots from Languedoc in France where the "de Gibernes" lived in Chateau de Gibertain. Charles Giberne was from a large family. He had eight sisters and four brothers. (Note: One of his sisters was the artist and notable convert to Roman Catholicism Maria Rosina Giberne (1802−1885)) Three of his brothers also served in India.

Giberne's parents married at St. Mary the Virgin, Walthamstow on 11 December 1838. It is not absolutely clear how many siblings Giberne had. The British Library's India Family History and Families in British India Society records show:

- Mary Lydia Giberne, on 1 December 1840 at Karrack, Persian Gulf. She died at Ahymednuggar on 7 May 1842, aged 17 months.
- Twins born on 21 January 1844 at Ahmednuggur, with the boy still-born and the girl, Helen Mary Giberne, surviving. However, she died in the first quarter of 1861, aged 17.
- Agnes, born on 19 November 1845 at Belgaum.
- Florence, born on 1 June 1847 at Poona. However, she died in Brighton on 5 September 1858, aged 11 years.
- Eliza, born on 5 December 1848, at her maternal grandfather's at Worton House, Over-Warton, Oxfordshire. Died aged 79 on 22 February 1928.

By the time of the 1851 census, Lydia Mary was staying with her four surviving daughters at Beach in Weston-super-Mare with the Rector of Eyam in Derbyshire and his family. Charles Giberne had already been pensioned off and was staying at no 17, Beaufort, in Bath with two servants. By the time of the 1861 census, only two girls survived, Giberne and her sister Eliza.

Eliza was educated privately, by governesses and special masters. She began to scribble stories at age seven and shared these with her sisters She ascribed her literary tastes to her mother and her scientific curiosity to her father.

=== Writing ===
Giberne states that she began to publish children's stories at seventeen. These were probably short stories in magazines. The first children's book by Giberne in the British Library is A Visit to Aunt Agnes (Religious Tract Society, London, 1864). It was advertised on 24 November 1864 at the price of two shillings. Giberne would have been 19 by then. Copson states that her children's stories were "typical works of Victorian evangelical fiction emphasizing childish faults and the need for salvation."

The lithographs by Kronheim & Co. for A Visit to Aunt Agnes, by courtesy of the University of Florida Digital Collections.

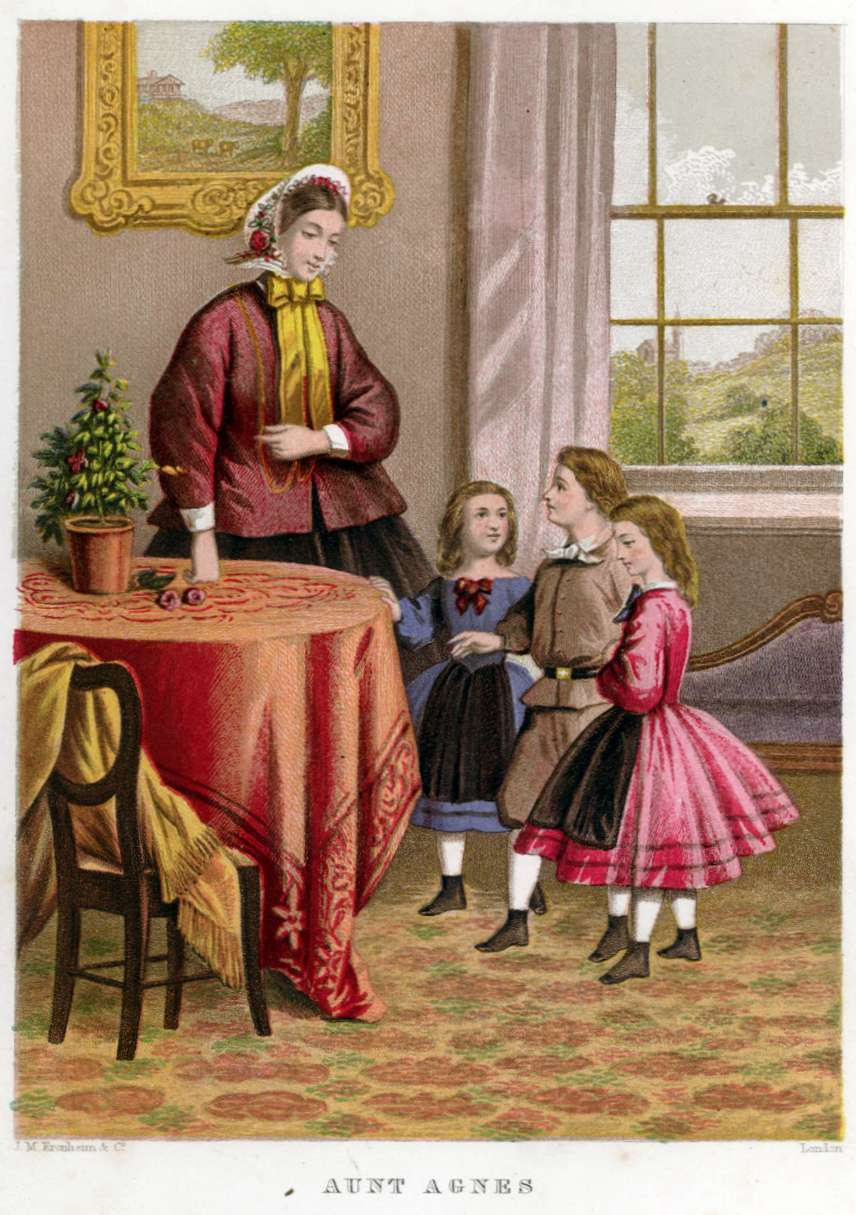
Aunt Agnes

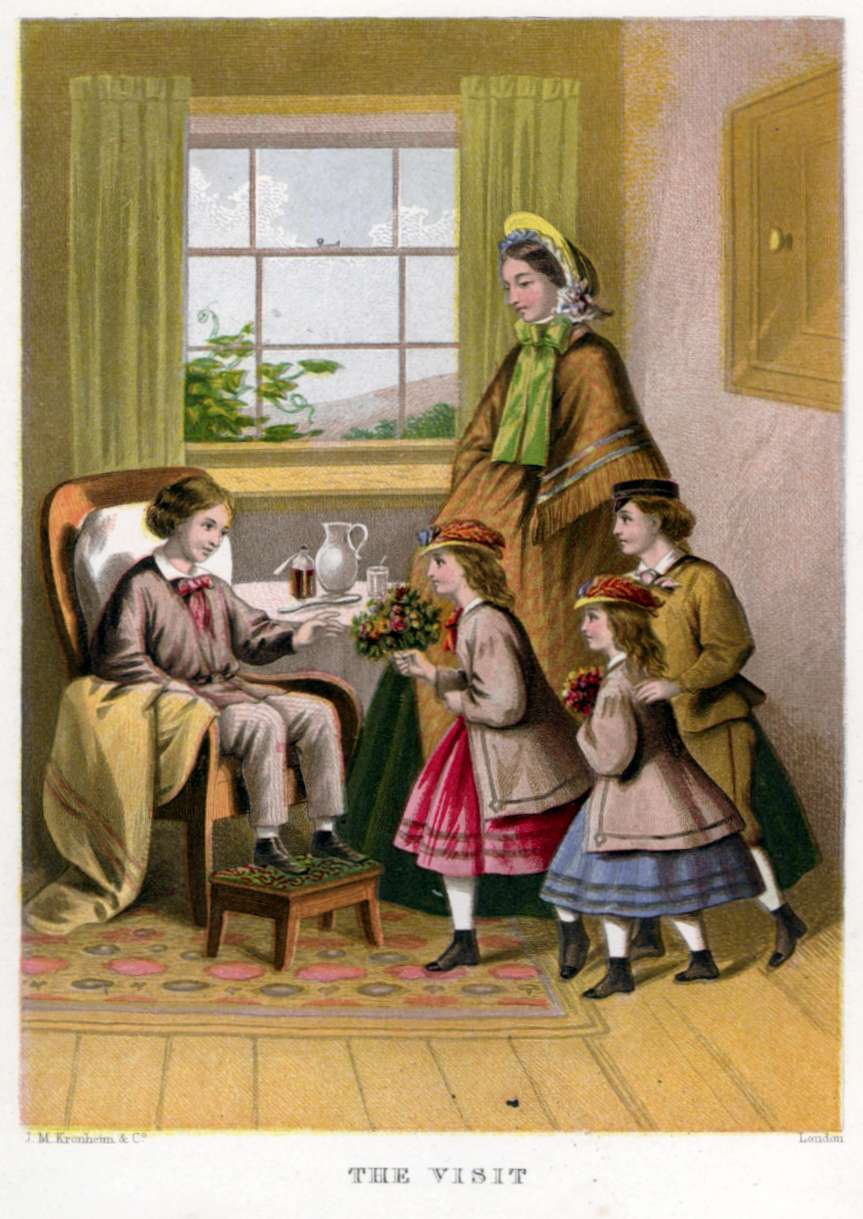
The Visit

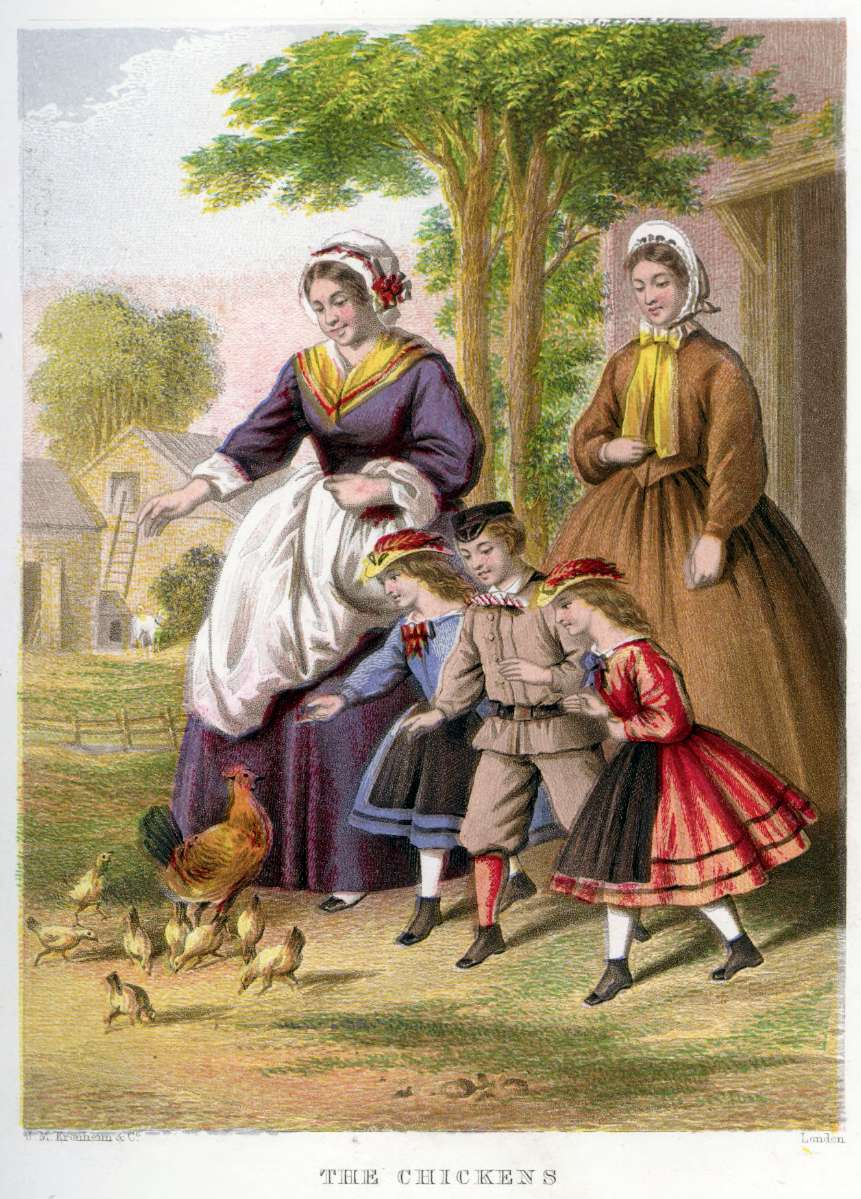
The Chickens

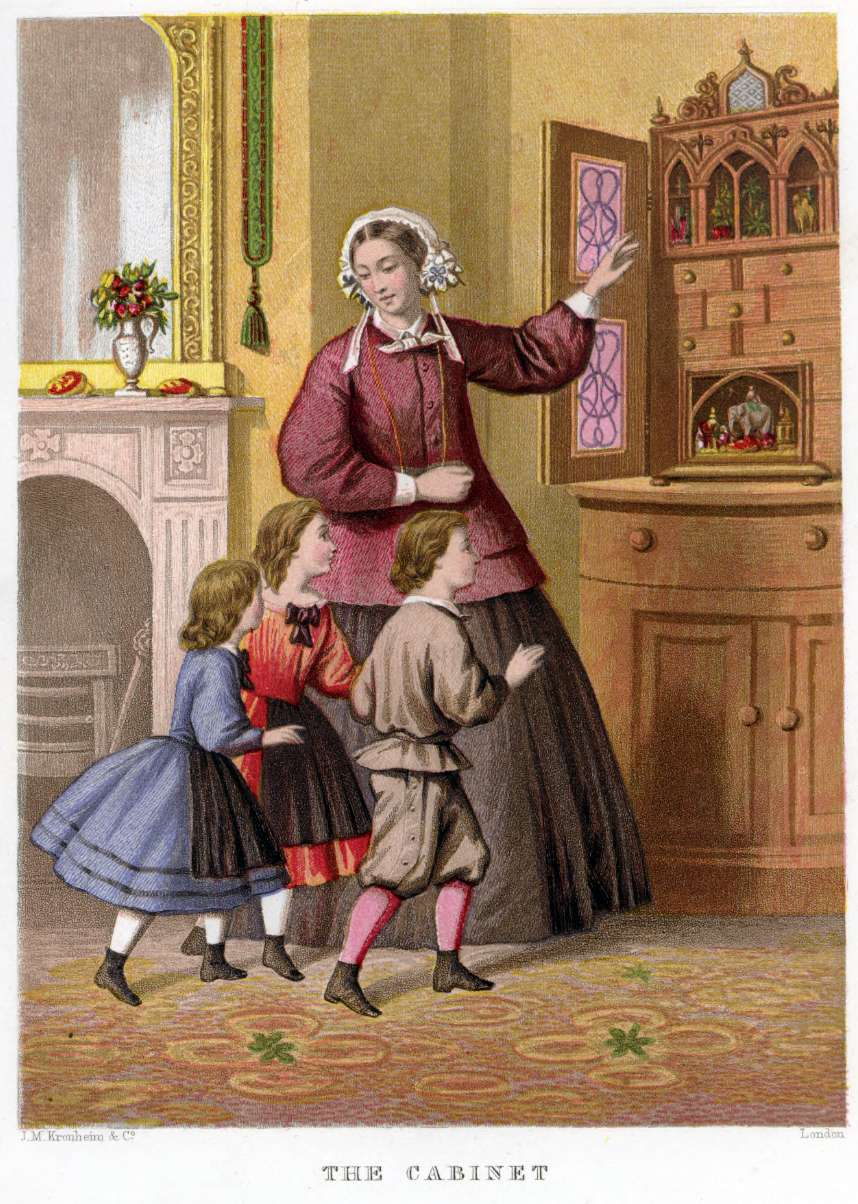
The Cabinet

Initially, Giberne's work was signed either A. G., or she was indirectly indicated through identifying other works she had written. The first book in England which bears her name was The Curate's House which she wrote to draw attention to clerical poverty. (Note: Clerical poverty was a serious problem in the Victorian Era. About one-quarter of the clergy were considered to be comfortably off, with at least £500 per annum in 1830. The desirable minimum income for a clergyman was thought to be £400.. Jervis reported that in 1854 that 6,750 parochial benefices were worth less than £300. This is why the list of charities prepared by the editor of the Ecclesiastical Gazette in 1859 shows some 59 central, and 153 Diocesan charities for the assistance of the Clergy.) Giberne had a wider range than just evangelical and didactic stories for young children. She also wrote books targeted at young adolescent girls, which was mainly published by the Religious Tract Society.

Giberne also wrote historical novels including:

- Detained in France : a tale of the First French Empire (Seeley, 1871). A story about the English people detailed by Napoleon on the outbreak of war.
- Aimée: A Tale of the Days of James the Second (Seeley, 1872). A story about the Huguenot persecution in France and their flight to England.
- Coulyng Castle, or, A knight of the Olden Days (Seeley, 1875). A picture of castle life under Henry IV and Henry V.
- Roy. A tale in the days of Sir John Moore (Pearson, 1901). Returns to the theme of those detained by Napoleon, but adds in Sir John Moore's famous retreat and the Battle of Corunna.
- Under Puritan Rule: a Tale of Troublous Days (National Society's Depository, 1909). Focuses on the sufferings of those Anglican clergy who were deprived of their livings by the Puritans.

In 1895 Giberne published A Lady of England: the Life and Letters of Charlotte Maria Tucker (Hodder & Stoughton), who wrote children's fiction under the pseudonym "A Lady of England" (A.L.O.E.), and late in life, became a missionary in India. (Note: This was the standard biography on Tucker, who used the pseudonym "A Lady of England" (A.L.O.E.) for her children's fiction. The daughter of a chairman of the East India Company, she was devoutly religious, but was constrained from engaging in mission-work in London by her parents. However, at fifty-four, being independent both financially and otherwise, she sailed for India where she settled in the Punjab and began visiting zenanas of both Hindu and Muslim families to familiarise the women there with Christian doctrine, without any great success.) Giverne's aunt Caroline Cuffley Giberne (1803-1885) had also worked as a missionary in India, and also concentrated on work with women and girls.

However, Giberne is best remembered for her books popularising science. Giberne was an amateur astronomer who worked on the committee setting up the British Astronomical Association and became a founder-member in 1890. (Note: The society was set up for those who were interested in astronomy, but precluded from one reason or another (e.g. being female) from joining the Royal Astronomical Society.) Giberne's first foray into science was a book on astronomy Sun, Moon and Stars: Astronomy for Beginners (Seeley, 1879). She had sent the proofs to Charles Pritchard (29 February 1808 – 28 May 1893), the Savilian Professor of Astronomy at Oxford University and he was so impressed by it that he wrote, without being asked, a very positive introduction.. The Graphic stated that "[a]s an introduction to a science, it could scarcely be more attractive, and it is the best book of the kind we have seen."

The book remained in print for many years and had sold 10,000 copies by 1884, 24,000 copies by 1898, and 26,000 by 1903, when she issued another revised edition. However, this total probably does not include the sales in the United States, where the book was published as The Story of The Sun, Moon, and Stars, as the totals cited come from the edition count on the title page of the Seeley editions, and Seeley would only have counted their own editions, and not those of another publisher.

Giberne wrote several other books on Astronomy including:

- Among the Stars, or Wonderful Things in the Sky (Seeley, 1884), intended for younger children, where a boy called Ikon has the solar system and stars explained to him by a professor. St James's Gazette said that Giberne "tells about the wonderful things in the sky in clear pleasant language that every child can understand, and in a manner that is probably new to them. Some of the lessons are illustrated by little experiments which will be both amusing and instructive to repeat in the nursery; and there are visits the sun and moon that read like strange and beautiful fairy-tales. In every way this is a most excellent book for children.
- The Starry Skies, First Lessons on the Sun, Moon and Stars (Seeley & Co). In this book Giberne "offered lucid and simple explanations of gravity, the seasons, the rotation of the earth, the moon, the sun, the planets of the solar system, comets, meteors, stars, and nebulae". As with some of the other books for children Giberne used the power of the imagination to help teach scientific fact.
- Radiant Suns (Seeley & Co, 1895), a sequel to Sun, Moon and Stars but more advanced. It covered the history of astronomy, the relatively new science of spectral analysis, and a discussion of the stellar universe.
- This Wonderful Universe (SPCK, 1895). Completely rewritten and revised for an illustrated edition in 1920. An introduction to the heavens for younger readers.

Giberne did not ignore the other sciences, she also wrote books on:

- Geology, with The world's foundations, or Geology for beginners (Seeley, 1882). In her preface, Gilberne noted that some counted Geology to be a dangerous subject, and that there can be no conflict between the Bible, as the word of God, and His handiwork, in the shape of the Geology of the Earth.
- Physics, with Twilight Talks, or easy lessons on things around us (Religious Tract Society, 1882).A little volume for children on scientific subjects. In her preface, Giberne says that if the book were called "An introduction to Physics" it would frighten off its intended users.
- Hydrology with Father Aldur. A water story, etc. Here again imagination (a sleeping boy dreams of the river as a living being) and scientific fact are interwoven.
- Meteorology, with The Ocean of Air, Meteorology for Beginners (Seely, 1890). This volume also had an enthusiastic preface written by Charles Pritchard, again volunteered by him, when he read the proofs. The book described the "gases, water, forms of life, movement, disturbances, and forces within air." The photographs illustrating the book were said to be "genuine works of art".
- Natural History, with A modern Puck, a fairly story for children (Jarrold, 1898). This was ostensibly a fairy story but contained lots of nuggets of information about animal behaviour, insects etc. One review said that the book was one which "teaches much", but unobtrusively and not "as if it were teaching at all," and every healthy-minded child must be delighted "with such a book, with its pleasant and quite natural make-believe." The magic cloak which the fairy used enabled the heroine to see "into the homes of many an animal and insect."
- Oceanography, with The Mighty Deep and what we know of it (Pearson, 1902). One reviewer said "Call it oceanography and it is apt to repel; put it in Miss Giberne'e graceful words and it attracts while it teaches.". Another said "It is a singularly informing book, and is written in such a way that any boy or girl of average intelligence will not only understand it readily but will thoroughly enjoy it. There are too too few books of this class."
- Science in general, with This Wonder World (Religious Tract Society, 1913). In this volume, Giberne addresses a range of topics "how the wood and the iron and the coal come to be here, and how the air and the water and the fire serve us. Concerning these and other subjects such as flying machines, Miss Giberne writes very simply and effectively."
- Botany, with The garden of earth, a little book on plant-life, plantgrowth, and the ways and uses of plants (SPCK, 1920). "It is not a Manual of Botany with hard and dry names, which often make the subject distasteful, but a book introducing us gradually and simply to an intimate and loving acquaintance with the inhabitants of the vegetable world."

Giberne was prolific. At her peak in the 1880s and 1890s, she produced 36 and 33 volumes respectively. Her output tapered off after 1900. However, her output over eight decades indicates her dedication to her work.

Published volumes by Giberne per decade
Decade	Number
1860–1869	12
1870–1879	26
1880–1889	36
1890–1899	33
1900–1909	11
1910–1919	7
1920–1929	4
1930–1939	1

== Later life ==
Although the Oxford Dictionary of National Biography states that Giberne wrote for her own interests rather than to earn money, she relied to some extent on her royalty income. Giberne found herself with severe financial problems in 1905, and applied to the Royal Literary Fund. She was now sixty, and was said to have given up the best years of her life to support her ailing father (who had died in 1902). She had failing eyesight, with cataracts in both eyes, and a weak heart. Her income was listed as an annuity, the royalties from her books, and £100 a year from the Indian Civil Service as a pensioner's child. She was awarded £200 from the Royal Literary Fund and £273 from the Royal Bounty Fund, both to be put towards the purchase of a Post Office annuity. However, her royalty income was falling, and her nominal income of £170 was not sufficient due to the rising cost of living, and she had been force to sell some furniture and all of her silver as well as moving into smaller accommodation. This time she was awarded a grant of £50.

The 1911 census found her lodging in rooms at 2, The Avenue, Eastbourne. In 1939 she was living at 21 Enys Road Eastbourne. She died in a nursing home at 16 Motcombe Road, Eastbourne, on 20 August 1939, aged 94. Her estate was worth £539 18s 11d.

== List of works ==
The following list of works has developed largely from a search on the Jisc Library Hub Discover database. (Note: The Jisc Library Hub Discover brings together the catalogues of 168 major UK and Irish libraries. Additional libraries are being added all the time, and the catalogue collates national, university, and research libraries.). Where necessary, missing details such as page counts and publisher's names have been filled in by searches on WorldCat and on newspaper archives.

Published works by Giberne
Serial	Year	Title	Place	Publisher (in London unless stated)	Pages	Notes
1	1860	Short account of the four ancient empires	Madras	American Mission Press, Madras	42 p., 14 cm	(Note: A brief account of the empires of Assyria, Persia, Greece under Philip of Macedon and Alexander, and Rome. Translated into Tamil by W. T. Satthianadhan as Pūrvīkattiluḷḷa nān̲ku irācciyaṅkaḷin̲ curukkac carittiram. Although the British Library gives the date of the publication as 1860, when Giberne was 15, this seems unlikely as she states in here Who's Who entry that she began writing for publication when she was 17. Satthianadhan was a Hindu convert to Christianity who became an Anglican priest. His son Samuel Satthianadhan was a writer, educator, and social reformer. Giberne's cousin Caroline Cuffley Giberne (1803-1885) was the mentor for Satthianadhan's wife Anna, and also corresponded with Satthianadhan.)
2	1864	A visit to Aunt Agnes, for very little children	London	Religious Tract Society	80 p., ill. (a col.), 19 cm	(Note: No author name given on book. In this book, Thiel noted that "readers learn not only of childish pastimes but also of contemporary attitudes toward India and China and toward the American novel Uncle Tom's Cabin, published twelve years previously.")
3	1864	Maude Grenville	London	SPCK	2, 132p., 3 ill., 18 cm	(Note: Published in October 1864 with the author as A. G.)
4	1865	Among the Mountains, or the Harcourts at Montreux	London	Seeley, Jackson, and Halliday	348 p., 8º	(Note: The author was given as A. G.)
5	1865	Mabel and Cora, or The sisters of Stoneycroft Hall	London	Seeley, Jackson, and Halliday	245 p. : fs., 19 cm	(Note: The author was given as A. G.)
6	1865	Sunday Afternoons with Mamma	London	Religious Tract Society	80 p., 8º	(Note: No author given on book.)
7	1866	Linda	London	SPCK	1, 159 p., 3 p. of plates : ill, 19 cm	(Note: The author was given as A. G. and as the author of Maude Grenville.)
8	1867	Beechenhurst, A tale	London	Nisbet & Co	4, 418, 2p. : ill., 17 cm	(Note: The author was given as A. G. and the author of Among the Mountains, Mabel and Cora, etc.)
9	1868	Willie and Lucy at the sea-side, For very little children	London	Religious Tract Society	96 p., plates (col.) : ill., 17.8 cm	(Note: The author was given as A. G. with no reference to previous titles.)
10	1869	Hungering and thirsting	London	Religious Tract Society	106, 2p. : ill., 17 cm	(Note: No author name given on book.)
11	1869	Mignonette	London	Seeley, Jackson, & Halliday	348 p. : ill., 19 cm	(Note: The author was given as A. G. and the author of Among the Mountains, Mabel and Cora, Beechenhurst, etc.)
12	1869	The curate's home	London	Seeley, Jackson, and Halliday	4,391,5p. : front., 8 ̊.	(Note: The Oxford Dictionary of National Biography states that this was the first book published under Giberne's name.)
13	1871	Charity's birthday text	London	Religious Tract Society	104, 4 p. : 2 ill., 16 cm	(Note: No author name given, but described as by the author of Willie and Lucy at the Sea-Side, and Hungering and Thirsting etc.)
14	1871	Detained in France, a tale of the first French empire	London	Seeley, Jackson & Halliday	v, 1, 363, 5 p. : 1 illustration, 20 cm	(Note: Author given as Agnes Giberne. Giberne write a second book about the thoses detained at the time of Napoleon in Roy: a Tale in the days of Sir John Moore in 1900.)
15	1871	Eva and Bertie, a tale for little children	London	Religious Tract Society	178, 2 p., 1 p. of plates : ill., 16 cm	
16	1871	The day-star, or The Gospel story for little ones	London	Seeley, Jackson, and Halliday	vii, 264 p. 11 p. of plates : ill., 17 cm	
17	1872	Aimée, a tale of the days of James the Second	London	Seeley, Jackson, and Halliday	vii, 1, 404, 4 p. : fs., 8 ̊	(Note: A novel based on the 1871 persecution of the Huguenots in the reign of Louis XIV. The flight of many to England, and the struggle for religious freedom there under James II.)
18	1872	The two little Bruces	London	Religious Tract Society	191, 1 p., plates, 16.5 cm	
19	1872	Willie and Lucy at Home	London	Religious Tract Society	104 p., 8º	
20	1873	Not forsaken, or The old house in the city	London	Seeley, Jackson, and Halliday	iv, 194, 2 p., 4 ill., 18 cm	
21	1874	Drusie's own story	London	Seeley, Jackson, & Halliday	329, 3 p., 1 plate : 1 ill., 19 cm	
22	1874	Floss Silverthorn, or the Master's little handmaid	London	Seeley, Jackson, & Halliday	(c. 240p p. in other eds.), 8º	
23	1874	The mists of the valley	London	Seeley, Jackson, & Halliday	247 p., 19 cm	
24	1874	Willie and Lucy abroad	London	Religious Tract Society	92 p., 4 of col. plates : ill., 19 cm	
25	1875	Coulyng Castle, or A knight of the olden days	London	Seeley, Jackson, and Halliday	x, 347, 2 p. : 1 ill., 19 cm	(Note: A historical novel set at Couling Castle near Cobham in Kent. This is a picture of castle life in the time of Henry IV and Henry V, and a love-tale.)
26	1875	Lisa Baillie's journal	London	Religious Tract Society	105, 2 p. : 1 ill., 16 cm	
27	1875	Old Mattie's Musings. [In verse.]	London		1 Vol., 16º	
28	1876	The lost found, or Brunhild's trials	London	Religious Tract Society	127 p., 1 ill., 17 cm	
29	1876	Will Foster of the ferry	London	Seeley, Jackson, & Halliday	iv, 186 p., 1 1 ill., 18 cm	
30	1877	The battle-field of life	London	Seeley, Jackson, & Halliday	iv, 344, 4 p., 1 1 ill., 19 cm	
31	1878	Nurse Seagrave's story, her first, second and third places	London	Religious Tract Society	128 p. : ill., 17 cm	
32	1878	The hillside children	London	Seeley, Jackson & Halliday	iv, 259 p., 1 illustrations, 19 cm	
33	1879	Hand and Heart Christmas Box of Fireside Tales and Sketches	London	'Hand and Heart' Publishing Office	160 p., 8º	(Note: With other authors)
34	1879	Hohnfrida's Christmas Cheer				(Note: Not a book but a Christmas Story in A Day of Days.)
35	1879	Muriel Bertram, a tale	London	Seeley, Jackson, and Halliday	vi, 382, 2 p. : ill., 19 cm	
36	1879	Sun, moon and stars, astronomy for beginners	London	Seeley, Jackson, and Halliday	xiv, 302 p., 16 ill. (some col.), 19 cm	(Note: The first of Gibnernes works that popularised science. The Pall Mall Gazette stated that "The style of the book is well fitted to excite attention; it must be a dull boy or girl who will not find it attractive, and it is satisfactory to know that the author can not only write pleasantly, but that her book, in the judgment of a distinguished astronomer, is 'free from any considerable inaccuracy or any unpardonable exaggeration.'")
37	1879	The rector's home, a story	London	Seeley, Jackson, and Halliday	viii, 373 p., 19 cm	
38	1879	The upward gaze	London	Seeley, Jackson, and Halliday	viii, 183 p., 11 cm	
39	1880	Royal Priests	London	Seeley & Co	x, 176 p., (16º)	(Note: Subtitled as "A treatise on the Israelitish priesthood as typical of the Christian priesthood.")
40	1881	Duties and Duties. A tale	London	Seeley, Jackson & Co	viii, 346 p., 8º	
41	1881	My Father's House, or Thoughts about Heaven	London	Seeley & Co	x, 234 p., 16º	
42	1881	Readings with the Little Ones	London	Religious Tract Society	95 p., 8º	
43	1881	Through the Linn, or Miss Temple's Wards	London	Religious Tract Society	160 p., 8º	
44	1882	Decima's Promise	London	Nisbet & Co	vi, 244 p., 8º	
45	1882	Jacob Witherby, or "Need of Patience."	London	Religious Tract Society	160 p., 8º	
46	1882	Our Folks, John Churchill's letters home	London	'Hand & Heart' Publishing Office	86 p., 8º	
47	1882	Sweetbriar, or doings in Priorsthorp Magna.	London	Seeley, Jackson & Halliday	iv, 404 p., 8º	
48	1882	The world's foundations, or Geology for beginners	London	Seeley, Jackson, and Halliday	xi, 313 p., 16 ill. (8 col.), 20 cm	(Note: The Graphic said the book was "a geological work for beginners, written in a plain, straightforward style, which has much to recommend it, while the text is still further elucidated by numerous illustrations.")
49	1882	Trying to enter	London	Seeley, Jackson & Halliday	149 p., 8º	
50	1882	Twilight Talks, or easy lessons on things around us	London	Religious Tract Society	156 p., 8º	(Note: Described by the Fifeshire Journal as a little volume for children on scientific subjects.)
51	1883	Daily Evening Rest, or Thoughts of Peace about the Master	London	Nisbet & Co	viii, 243 p., 8º	
52	1883	Five little birdies. Illustrated with black-and-white drawings by Robert Barnes.	London	The Religious Tract Society	95 p., ill., 17 x 22 cm	(Note: Not a nature study, but the story of five orphan children. Illustrated by Robert Barnes.)
53	1883	Kathleen, the story of a home	London	Nisbet & Co	viii. 324 p., 8º	
54	1883	Next-door Neighbours	London	Religious Tract Society	128 p., 8º	
55	1883	The Nameless Shadow.	London	'Home Words' Office	378 p., 8º	
56	1884	Among the Stars, or wonderful things in the sky	London	Seeley & Co	viii, 310 p., 8º	(Note: Covers similar ground to Sun, Moon, and Stars but for younger children.)
57	1884	Beryl and Pearl	London	Nisbet & Co	viii, 343 p., 8º	
58	1884	Old Umbrellas, or Clarrie and her Mother	London	Nisbet & Co	147 p., 8º	
59	1885	Daisy of the "old meadow"	London	Nisbet & Co	x, 139, 28 p., 19 cm	
60	1885	Gwendoline	London	Religious Tract Society	256 p., 8º	
61	1885	St. Austin's Lodge, or Mr. Berkeley and his nieces [a tale]	London	Nisbet & Co	vii, 375 p., 8º	
62	1885	Tim Teddington's dream, or "Liberty, equality, and fraternity"	London	'Home Words' Office	42p.	
63	1886	Enid's silver bond	London	Nisbet & Co	vi, 375 p., 5 ill., 19 cm	
64	1886	Five Thousand Pounds	London	Nisbet & Co	144 p., 8º	(Note: The London Correspondent of the Dunedin Evening Star considered that this was "a very suitable book to give a servant-girl.")
65	1886	Profit and loss, or Life's ledger	London	Religious Tract Society	218,4p.,1plate, 19 cm	
66	1887	Father Aldur. A water story, etc.	London	Seeley & Co	vi, 333 p., 8º	
67	1887	His adopted daughter, or A quiet valley	London	John F. Shaw and Co	346 p., 4 of plates (inc. front.) : ill., 21 cm	
68	1887	Miss Con, or All those girls	London	Nisbet & Co	viii, 341 p. : front., ill., plates, 19 cm	(Note: Illustrated by her cousin, the artist Edgar Giberne.)
69	1888	Ralph Hardcastle's Will	London	Hatchards	vi, 356 p., 8º	
70	1888	Ready, aye Ready!	London	Nisbet & Co	viii, 194 p., 8º	
71	1888	The Earls of the Village	London	J. F. Shaw & Co	256 p., 8º	
72	1888	Twilight Verses	London	Nisbet & Co	iv. 72 p., 8º	
73	1889	Number Three Winifred Place	London	Nisbet & Co	viii, 264 p., 8º	
74	1889	Stories jolly, stories new, stories strange & stories true, a series of new and original tales for boys and girls from six to fourteen years old	London	Skeffington & Son	viii, 265, 3 p., plates : ill., 19 cm	(Note: Included the story Jackie's New Dodge by Giberne. This was one of a series of children's anthologies by Skeffington.)
75	1890	Least said, soonest mended	London	James Nisbet & Co	260 p., 4 p. of plates : ill, 20 cm	
76	1890	Nigel Browning	London	Longmans & Co	viii, 435 p., 8º	
77	1890	The ocean of air, meteorology for beginners	London	Seeley and Co	xiv, 2, 340 p., 16 ill., 20 cm	
78	1891	Miss Devereux, Spinster, a study in development	London	Longmans & Co	2 volumes, 8º	(Note: Sutherland describes this book as ending with banns, frocks, and veils.)
79	1891	The Dalrymples	London	Nisbet & Co	vi. 279 p., 8º	
80	1891	Tim Teddington's Shoes, or who was the worst off? A second dream	London	'Home Words' Office	80 p., 8º	
81	1891	Won at last, or Mrs. Briscow's nephews	London	John F. Shaw and Co	vi, 7-256 p. : ill., 20 cm	
82	1892	A case of poisoning	London	SPCK	30 p., 21 cm	(Note: Penny booklets for the people, one of six in a set by Giberne)
83	1892	Beside the waters of comfort, thoughts from many minds	London	Seeley & Co	389 p., 18 cm	
84	1892	Great unwashed Jimmy	London	SPCK E. & J.B. Young & Co	32 p., 22 cm	
85	1893	A pretty kettle of fish	London	S.P.C.K	31 p., 21 cm	
86	1893	Ida's Secret, or the Towers of Ickledale	London	J. F. Shaw & Co	220 p., 8º	
87	1893	Life in a Nutshell, a story	London	J. F. Shaw & Co	vi, 222 p., 8º	
88	1893	On the horns of a dilemma	London	SPCK	32 p., 21 cm	
89	1893	The dread cry	London	SPCK	32 p., 21 cm	
90	1894	By hook or by crook, a story of water	London	SPCK	32p., 22 cm	
91	1894	Miles Murchison	London	Nisbet & Co	vi, 184 p., 8º	
92	1894	The Andersons, brother and sister	London	Nisbet & Co	300 p., 4 ill., 20 cm	
93	1894	The starry skies, first lessons on the sun, moon and stars	London	Seeley & Co	viii, 242, 6 p. : ill., 18 cm	(Note: Seeley's first lesson books.)
94	1895	A lady of England, the life and letters of Charlotte Maria Tucker	London	Hodder & Stoughton	xii, 519p : ill, 21 cm	
95	1895	Radiant suns, a sequel to "Sun, moon and stars"	London	Seeley & Co.	xiv, 2, 328, 8 p., 18 ill. (some col.), 20 cm	(Note: More advanced than Sun, Moon, and Stars, this book covers the history of astronomy, the relatively new science of spectral analysis, and the broader universe.)
96	1895	This Wonderful Universe	London	Seeley & Co	128 p., 8º	(Note: Later completely rewritten for a 1920 edition.)
97	1896	Life-Tangles, or the Journal of Rhoda Frith	London	J. F. Shaw & Co	288 p., 8º	
98	1896	Little eyebright, and her pund o' care	London	J. F. Shaw & Co	160, 16 p. : ill., 19 cm	
99	1896	Marigold's Decision, etc.	London	Nisbet & Co	128 p., 8º	
100	1896	Miss Primrose	London	J. F. Shaw & Co	160 p., 8º	
101	1896	Old Comrades	London	J. F. Shaw & Co	218 p., 8º	
102	1896	The Girl at the Dower House and afterward, etc.	London	W. & R. Chambers	374 p., 8º	(Note: Sutherland describes this book as "a glum story of crossed love".)
103	1897	Little Miss Lustring	London	Marshall, Russell & Co	109 p., (12º)	(Note: A volume in the publisher's Idyll library.)
104	1898	A modern Puck, a fairy story for children	London	Jarrold	278, 10 p. : 50 ill., 20 cm	(Note: An exploration of natural history very cleverly wrapped up in a fairy story.)
105	1898	Everybody's business	London	John F. Shaw and Co	viii, 308, 32 p., 5 ill., 20 cm	
106	1898	Monsters of Olden Times, with an account of the early history of the earth, etc.	Madras	Christian Literature Society for India, Madras	44 p., 8º	(Note: This was in the Society's "One Anna Library". This was "an account of the early history of the earth, and introduces the reader to such monsters as the mammoth, mastodon, iguanodon, hadrosaurus and other extinct animals.")
107	1899	Easy Lessons on things around us	London	Religious Tract Society	156 p., 8º	
108	1901	Anthony Cragg's Tenant	London	Religious Tract Society	256 p., 8º	
109	1901	Roy. A tale in the days of Sir John Moore	London	C. Arthur Pearson	x, 328 p., 8º	(Note: Giberne's second story (the first was the 1871 Detained in France) about the thousands of English travellers whom Napoleon detained on the outbreak of war and kept for years as prisoners. Sir John Moore's famous retreat to Corunna, and his victory there, is featured.)
110	1902	A knight of honour, historical and other stories	London		1 Vol, 8vo.	(Note: With David Ker, Lossing G. Brown, and others)
111	1902	The Mighty Deep and what we know of it	London	C. Arthur Pearson	xii, 290 p., 8º	(Note: The Globe said the book was ". . . unquestionably readable and at the same time eminently instructive.")
112	1902	The Rack of this Tough World	London	Hutchinson & Co	vii. 335 p., 8º	(Note: Kemp describes this book as "a commonplace thriller focused on a family taint which is redeemed by self-sacrifice")
113	1903	Stories of the Abbey Precinct	London	Religious Tract Society	313, 2 p., 3 ill., 20 cm	
114	1903	Sun, moon and stars, astronomy for beginners	London	Seeley & Co	2, xvi, 329 p., 16 ill. (some col.), 20 cm	
115	1905	The Pride o' the Morning	London	S. C. Brown, Langham & Co	vii. 312 p., 8º	
116	1906	Rowena	London	T. Werner Laurie	viii. 307 p., 8º	
117	1907	Little 'Why-Because'	London	Religious Tract Society	180 p., 8º	
118	1909	Under Puritan rule, a tale of troublous days	London	National Society's Depository	298, 6 p., 5 ill., 21 cm	(Note: A Historical Novel with ten episodes based on one set of characters, illustrating the persecution of Anglican clergymen under the Long Parliament and Cromwell, when 8,000 or so were expelled from their livings. Historically accurate, and many of the main characters were real people.)
119	1911	Polly, the Postmaster's Daughter	London	Religious Tract Society	48 p., 8º	(Note: [Sandringham Series of Penny Stories. no. 19.])
120	1911	Val and his friends	London	Society for the Propagation of the Gospel in Foreign Parts	viii, 190 p., 16 17 ill., 20 cm	
121	1912	Glimpses of Christ ... With a preface by Arthur W. Robinson	London	Skeffington & Son	xi, 140 p., 8º	
122	1913	Life's Little Stage	London	Religious Tract Society	320 p., 8º	
123	1913	This Wonder-World	London	Religious Tract Society	xii, 195 p., 8º	
124	1913	Two little girls and Aunt Bessie	London	Religious Tract Society	31, 1 p.; ill.; 19 cm	(Note: Nation Story Readers Grade I, No. 2)
125	1914	The Doings of Doris	London	Religious Tract Society	368 p., 2 2 col. ill., 20 cm	
126	1920	This Wonderful Universe	London	SPCK	x, 182 p., 8º	(Note: New illustrated edition, completely revised and rewritten version of the original of 1897, and not, as the reviewer in the Aberdeen Press and Journal stated, a revised edition of Sun Moon and Stars.)
127	1921	The garden of earth, a little book on plant life, plant growth, and the ways and uses of plants	London	SPCK	xiv, 178 p : col. front., illus, 19 cm	(Note: A primer on botany and the natural world. "This work, with its many fine diagrams, will be sure to be popular, treating, as it does, with the world plant life, the family relationships, the work of roots and stems, the power of sunlight, and the wonderful work of flowers, winds, and insects.")
128	1928	Jock with Mousie, etc.	London	Religious Tract Society	192 p., 8º	
129	1929	Capitalism and the Common Good. By H. J. Marshall and Agnes Giberne	London	London Ratepayers Union	48 p., 8º	(Note: With H. J. Marshall)
130	1930	Please Tell Me Another Tale, A Collection Of Short Original Stories for Children.	London	Skeffington & Son	220 p., fs., ill., 18 cm	(Note: This anthology of children's stories included one by Giberne.)

== See also ==
- Timeline of women in science
