= Raoul Vaneigem =

Belgian philosopher (1934–2026)

- Vaneigem in 2005
- Born: 21 March 1934; Lessines, Hainaut Province, Belgium
- Died: 28 July 2026 (aged 92); Sant Pol de Mar, Barcelona
- Education: Free University of Brussels
- Notable work: The Revolution of Everyday Life
- Movement: Situationist International

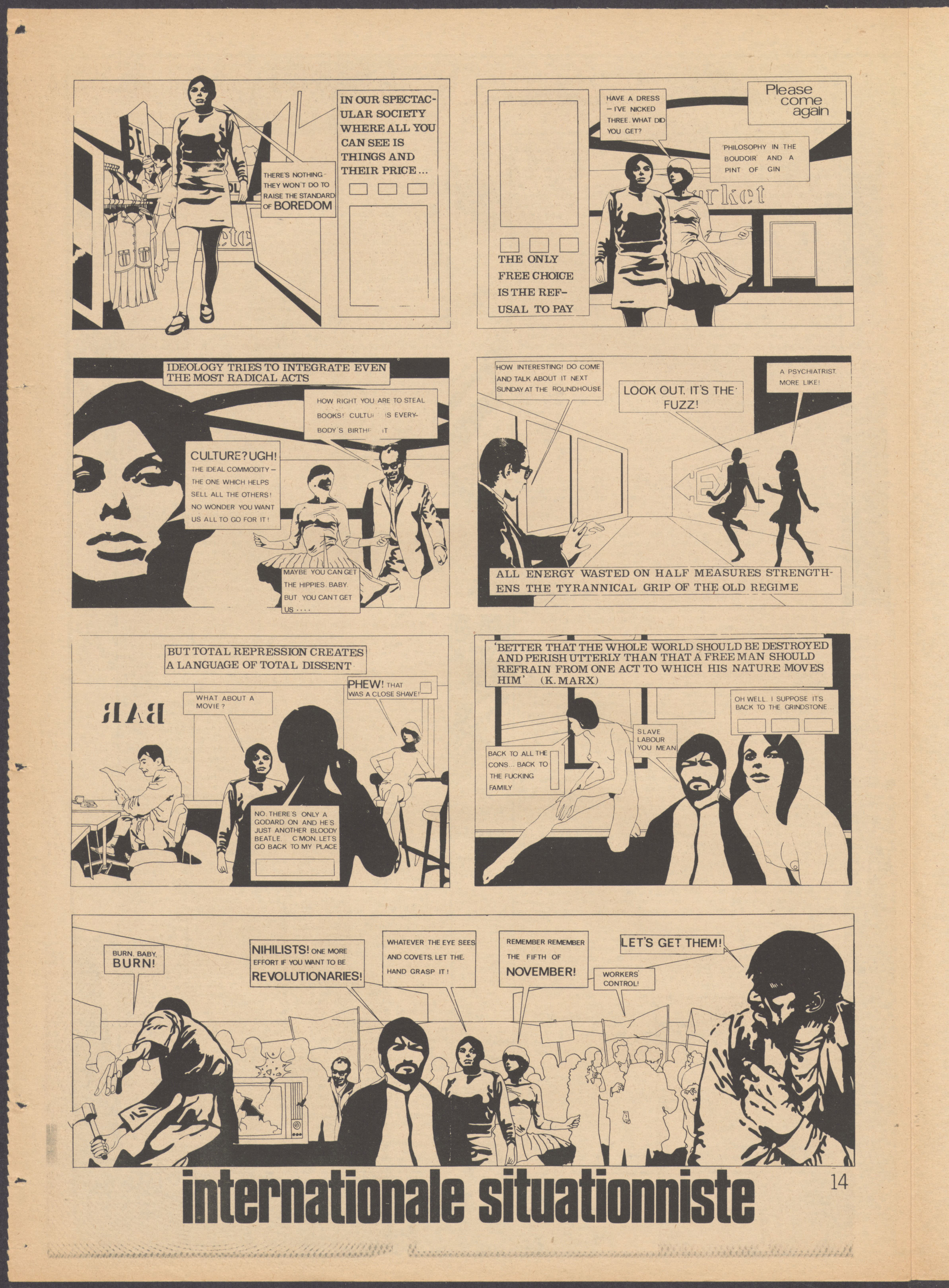
This cartoon by Vaneigem, shown here on a page of the 28 March 1968 issue of Seattle underground paper Helix, was later published in Internationale Situationniste #12 (September 1969).

Raoul Vaneigem (/væneɪˈɡɛm/; French: [vanegɛm]; Dutch: [raːˈʋul vɑnˈɛiɣəm, raːˈʔul]; 21 March 1934 – 28 July 2026) was a Belgian writer and revolutionary thinker known for his 1967 book The Revolution of Everyday Life (original title in French: “Traité de savoir-vivre à l'usage des jeunes générations”).

== Life and career ==
Vaneigem was born in Lessines (in Hainaut, Belgium) and studied romance philology at the Free University of Brussels from 1952 to 1956.

His meeting with Guy Debord in Paris in the summer of 1961 marked a turning point in his life: both became central figures in the Situationist International, a revolutionary and artistic movement that combined political theory with the culture of détournement to combat and transcend the alienation of the world of work and consumption. Their sensibilities differed, however: coming from the French bourgeoisie, Debord described capitalism in The Society of the Spectacle as an accumulation of appearances that imposes passivity, whilst Vaneigem, who was more lyrical and a reader of Lautréamont and Nietzsche, called for a revolution in everyday life through poetry (in its original sense of creation) and pleasures. Vaneigem's slogans frequently made it onto the walls of Paris during the May 1968 uprisings. His most famous book, and the one that contains the most famous slogans, is The Revolution of Everyday Life. In it, he challenged what he called "passive nihilism", a passive acceptance of the absurdities of modernism which he considered "an overture to conformism". According to the academic Pierre Taminiaux, Vaneigem drew direct inspiration from André Breton's original Surrealism of the 1920s, whilst seeking to transcend it by transposing it into the context of the consumer society of the Trente Glorieuses ; he would, moreover, go on to publish Histoire désinvolte du surréalisme. Their partnership came to an end in 1970 amid conflict, and the two men never saw each other again.

According to the website nothingness.org,

The voice of Raoul Vaneigem was one of the strongest of the Situationists. Counterpoised to Guy Debord's political and polemic style, Vaneigem offered a more poetic and spirited prose. The Revolution of Everyday Life (Traité de savoir-vivre à l'usage des jeunes générations), published in the same year as [Debord's] The Society of the Spectacle, helped broaden and balance the presentation of the SI's theories and practices. One of the longest SI members, and frequent editor of the journal Internationale Situationniste, Vaneigem finally left the SI in November 1970, citing their failures as well as his own in his letter of resignation. Soon after, Debord issued a typically scathing response denouncing both Vaneigem and his critique of the Situationist International.

After leaving the Situationist International, Vaneigem wrote a series of polemical books defending the idea of a free and self-regulating social order. He frequently made use of pseudonyms, including "Ratgeb", "Julienne de Cherisy," "Robert Desessarts," "Jules-François Dupuis," "Tristan Hannaniel," "Anne de Launay," and "Michel Thorgal." Further on, he defended freedom of speech in Nothing is sacred, everything can be said, and the philosopher Michel Onfray dedicated to him his Traité d'athéologie.

Vaneigem died at his home in Sant Pol de Mar (Catalonia, Spain) on 28 July 2026, at the age of 92.

=== Positions ===
Vaneigem lent his support to the revolt led by Subcomandante Marcos in the Mexican region of Chiapas in the mid-1990s, and later to the "yellow vests" movement in France in 2018 and 2019, declaring in an interview given to Le Monde in 2019: "Democracy is in the street, not in the ballot box."

== Partial bibliography ==
- The Revolution of Everyday Life (Traité de savoir-vivre à l'usage des jeunes générations)
- Traité de savoir-vivre à l'usage des jeunes générations
- Le livre des plaisirs (The Book of Pleasures), 1979, reprinted 1993.
- L'Ile aux delices (The Island of Delights), an erotic novel, 1979.
- Le mouvement du libre-esprit (The Movement of the Free Spirit), 1986.
- Adresse aux vivants sur la mort qui les gouverne et l'opportunité de s'en défaire, 1990
- Lettre de Staline à ses enfants enfin réconciliés de l'Est et de l'Ouest, 1992
- La résistance au christianisme. Les hérésies des origines au XVIIIe siècle, 1993
- Les hérésies, 1994
- Avertissement aux écoliers et lycéens, 1995
- Nous qui désirons sans fin, 1996
- La Paresse, 1996
- Notes sans portée, 1997
- Dictionnaire de citations pour servir au divertissement et à l'intelligence du temps, 1998
- Déclaration des droits de l'être humain. De la souveraineté de la vie comme dépassement des droits de le l'homme, 2001
- Pour une internationale du genre humain, 2001
- Salut à Rabelais ! Une lecture au présent, 2003
- Rien n'est sacré, tout peut se dire. Réflexions sur la liberté d'expression, 2003
- Le Chevalier, la Dame, le Diable et la Mort, 2003
- Modestes propositions aux grévistes, 2004
- Journal imaginaire, 2005

== See also ==
- "Consume, be silent, die"
