= Lance Sieveking =

English writer and BBC radio and TV producer

Lance Sieveking DFC
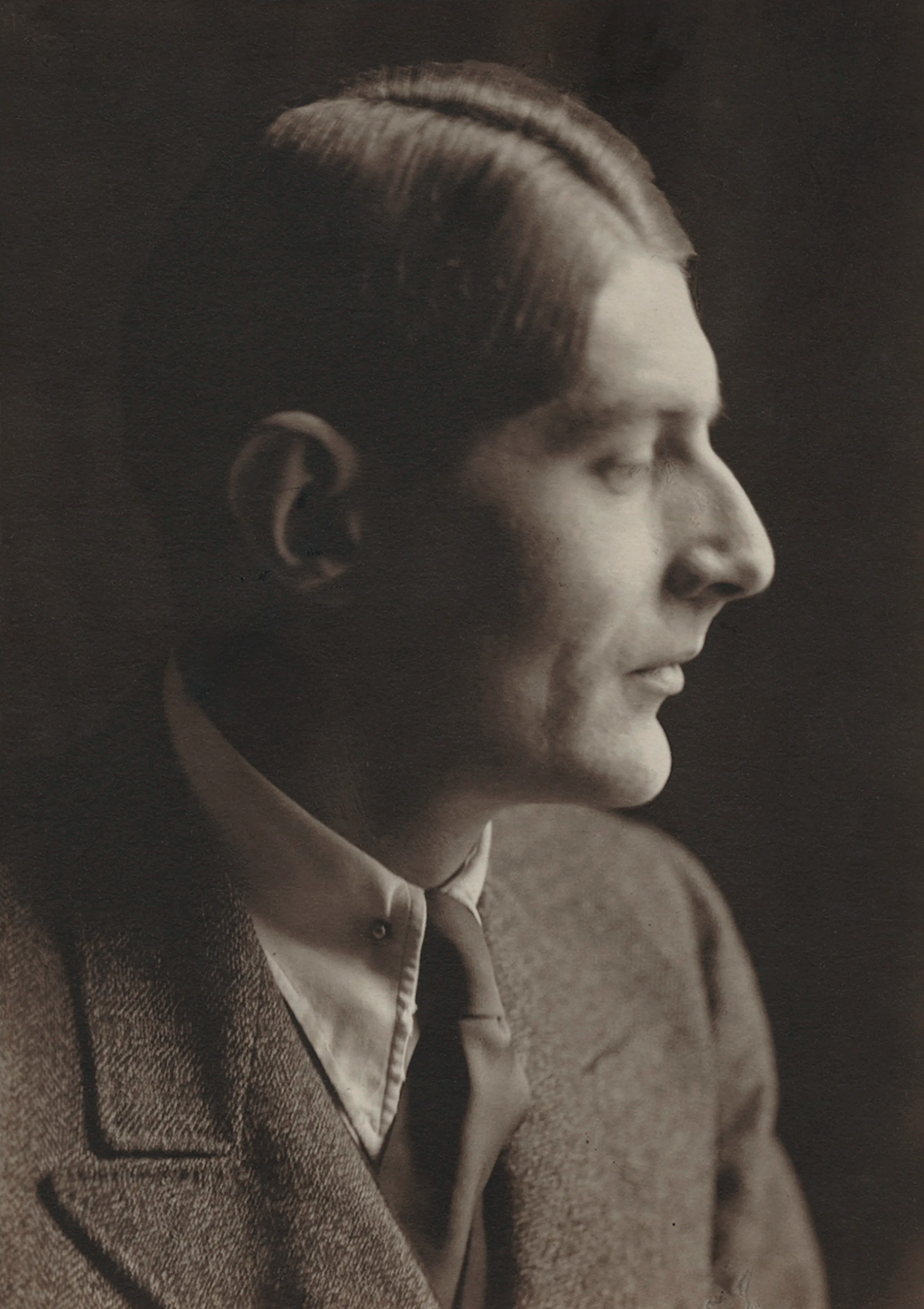
- Portrait by Olive Edis, c. 1925
- Born: Lancelot De Giberne Sieveking; 19 March 1896; Harrow, Middlesex, United Kingdom
- Died: 6 January 1972 (aged 75)
- Occupations: Writer, producer
- Spouses: April Constance Corona Quilter (m. 1924; div. 1928) Natalie Ackenhausen (m. 1929; div. 1939)
- Children: Gale Sieveking; Paul Sieveking
- Parent(s): Edward Sieveking; Isabel Giberne
- Relatives: Maria Giberne (aunt); Gerard Manley Hopkins (cousin)

Lancelot De Giberne Sieveking DFC (19 March 1896 – 6 January 1972) was an English writer and pioneer BBC radio and television producer. He was married three times, and was father to archaeologist Gale Sieveking (1925–2007) and Fortean-writer Paul Sieveking (1949–).

== Biography ==
Sieveking was born on 19 March 1896 in Harrow, Middlesex. His parents were Edward Gustavus Sieveking, a timber-merchant, and Isabel Giberne Sieveking, an author and suffragette whose aunts included the Roman Catholic nun Maria Rosina Giberne and Catherine Hopkins, mother of Gerard Manley Hopkins. He was a very creative child, writing from the age of six, and starting a novel aged 13 which would ultimately see print when he was 26. In-between, he "actively support[ed] the Women's Suffrage movement" before war broke out.

=== World War I ===
Sieveking (as well as his brother, Valentine Edgar Sieveking) served during World War I. Lance signed up with the Artists Rifles before "join[ing] the Royal Navy Air Service, [and winning] the DFC" before being "shot down over the Rhine" in 1917 and held as a German prisoner-of-war.

Upon his return to England, he attended St Catharine's College, Cambridge, and was close friends with fellow-Cambridge student Eric Maschwitz. The two were (with others) both editors on The New Cambridge chap book between 1920 and 1921.

=== BBC ===
Sieveking made his name with the BBC, starting out as assistant to the Director of Education, before "he went on to introduce the first running commentaries and adapt numerous classics for radio drama... it has been argued that the production of the first television play springs from his ingenuity". He was drama script editor for ten years (1940–50) before retiring "six years later in 1956".

He wrote The Stuff of Radio (1934), and his radio dramatisation of C. S. Lewis' first (chronologically) Chronicles of Narnia title The Magician's Nephew was approved by Lewis personally. In 1927, he designed "an eight-squared drawing meant to assist BBC radio's football commentators," (as well as listeners at home, who could get a copy of the same chart in the Radio Times. His 1928 experimental work The Kaleidoscope was partly recreated in 2022 by the London Bubble Young Theatre Makers and broadcast on BBC Radio 3 as part of a documentary about him.

Another early BBC radio drama producer, Val Gielgud, said of the "not altogether fortunate" Sieveking:

"He was perhaps over much influenced during his most impressionable years by G. K. Chesterton, and by the theory of that master of paradox that because some things were better looked at inside out or upside down such a viewpoint should invariably be adopted. Talented and imaginative beyond the ordinary, his eyes gazing towards distant horizons, he was liable to neglect what lay immediately before his feet."

Harry Heuser interprets Gielgud's words in the following way:

"Sieveking was an audio-visionary, a trier of radiogenic techniques at whom actors and colleagues would "gaze with a certain dumb bewilderment" as he "exhorted them to play 'in a deep-green mood,' or spoke with fluent enthusiasm of 'playing the dramatic-control panel, as one plays an organ." There was not much use for such a one in radio. As Gielgud put it, even British radio broadcasting, "provided him with no laboratory in which experiments could be carried out." "

In 1930, while radio drama was still relatively new, Sieveking found in the still-newer medium of television a place in which he could experiment with new ideas. To that end, (in collaboration with Gielgud) he brought an adaptation of Luigi Pirandello's short play L'uomo dal fiore in bocca (1923) to television as "The Man with the Flower in His Mouth", airing on 14 July 1930 – the first British television play. Very little of Sieveking's work survives in whole or in part (aside from some scripts – see below), but in 1967, "The Man.." was re-made, "authentically re-produced and presented by the original producer, Lance Sieveking, supported by the original art-work (by C R Nevinson) and music recording".

Sieveking's life was celebrated by the BBC in 2023 with a radio play by Tina Pepler called Kaleidoscope 3.

=== Papers ===
His papers (and those of his ancestors, dating from 1724 to 1971) are housed in the Lilly Library, Indiana University, and consist of "correspondence, radio plays, manuscripts for short stories, for novels, and for nonfiction works, diaries, drawings, and photographs" as well as "many photographs from the World War I period showing airplanes, North Africa and from Lance's captivity as a German prisoner-of-war."

== Bibliography and filmography ==
=== Television ===
- "Face of the Law" (writer) for Douglas Fairbanks, Jr., Presents AKA Rheingold Theatre (Season 3, episode 5; 1954)
- "The Third Clue" (writer) (1934)
  - Written by Frank Atkinson and Michael Barringer from the novel "The Shakespeare Murders" by Neil Gordon. Starring: Basil Sydney, Molly Lamont, Raymond Lovell, et al.
- "The Man with a Flower in His Mouth" (producer) (14 July 1930)
  - Directed by Val Gielgud; written by Luigi Pirandello from his L'uomo dal fiore in bocca. Starring the uncredited Earl Grey, Lionel Millard & Gladys Young.

=== Radio Plays ===
- Saturday Night Theatre, Home Service
  - "If", (Lord Dunsany/Lance Sieveking) with Lewis Stringer, Mollie Rankin & Leslie Perrins (22.04.44)
  - "Robert's Wife", (St. John G. Ervine/Lance Sieveking) with Edith Evans & Laidman Browne (01.07.44)
  - "The Burgomaster of Stilemonde", (Maurice Maeterlinck/Lance Sieveking/Muriel Pratte) with Bryan Powley, Richard Williams & Barry Morse (22.07.44)
  - "Thunder in the Air", (Robina Millar/Lance Sieveking) with Ivan Samson, Carl Bernard & Philip Cunningham (02.09.44)
  - "General John Regan", (George A. Birmingham/Lance Sieveking) with Cyril Cusack, James Stewart & Nita Hardy (17.03.45)
  - "Payment Deferred", (C.S. Forester/Lance Sieveking) with Ivor Barnard, Louise Hampton & Patricia Hayes (14.04.45)
  - "Nothing But The Truth", (James H. Montgomery/Lance Sieveking) with Richard Williams, Cyril Gardiner, Valentine Dyall, Gladys Spencer & Marjorie Westbury (21.04.45)
  - "Ambrose Applejohn's Adventure", (Walter Hackett/Lance Sieveking) with Laidman Browne, Jane Barrett, Norman Shelley & Arthur Ridley (04.08.45)
  - "Laburnum Grove", (J.B. Priestley/Lance Sieveking) [unknown cast] (09.03.46)
  - "If", (Lord Dunsany/Lance Sieveking) with Ronald Sidney & Elsa Palmer (13.09.47)
  - "Keep Murder Quiet", (Lance Sieveking & Selwyn Jepson) with Hermione Baddeley & Leslie Perrins (17.09.49)
  - "Silence in Heaven", (Lance Sieveking) with Norman Shelley & Gladys Young (29 April 1950)
  - "The Secret Battle", (A.P. Herbert/Lance Sieveking) with David Spenser, Simon Lack, Ronald Simpson & Laidman Browne (2 February 1957)
  - "A Private Volcano", (Lance Sieveking) with Norman Shelley & Frank Windsor (20 July 1957)
- "Mr. Leadbetter's Vacation", (H. G. Wells/Lance Sieveking) Produced by Martyn C. Webster [unknown cast] (unknown date;pre-1954)
  - 30mins. "..adapted by L.S. and based on a short story by H.G.Wells. Mr. Leadbetter is in holy orders, and for more years than he cares to remember has led a virtuous, worthwhile and very dull life. After drinking a little more than is good for him whilst on holiday, he rashly decides to commit a crime. It has consequences he could never have imagined – he ends up on the other side of the world." (This broadcast was repeated by NBC in their "Showcase" series, on 16 October 1954.)
- "Journey to the Centre of the Earth", (Jules Verne/Lance Sieveking) with Trevor Martin and Nigel Anthony, (broadcast in 7 episodes of 40min between 25 May 1962 – 6.7.62; also re-edited to 180min)
- "Dr. Jekyll & Mr. Hyde", (Robert Louis Stevenson/Lance Sieveking) with Cyril Shaps, Richard Williams, Manning Wilson, Gordon Davies, James Thomason & Geoffrey Lumsden (8.2.1956)

=== Books ===
- Dressing Gowns & Glue (1919) with John Nash and Paul Nash
- Gladstone Bags & Marmalade (1920)
- The Thought Machine (no date)
- The Cud. Being the Experimental Poems of... (1922)
- Stampede! (1924) with illustrations by G. K. Chesterton
- Bats in the Belfry: The Collected Nonsense Poems of L. de G. Sieveking (1927) with illustrations by John Nash and introductions by G. K. Chesterton and Max Beerbohm
- North American Binocular (No date)
- Smite and Spare not (1933)
- The Woman She Was (1934)
- The Stuff of Radio (1934) with an introduction by Richard Hughes
- Silence in Heaven (1936)
- Eye of the Beholder (1957) autobiography
- Airborne: Scenes from the Life of Lance Sieveking; Pilot, Writer & Broadcasting Pioneer, ed. and ann. by Paul Sieveking. With an Introduction by David Hendy, London : Strange Attractor Press, 2013, ISBN 978-1-907222-26-9
