= Isabel Giberne Sieveking =

British writer

- Born: 1857 Epsom, Surrey, England
- Died: 30 March 1936 (aged 78–79) Queen’s Gate, Kensington, London, England
- Resting place: Epsom Cemetery, Surrey, England
- Occupation: Historian and writer
- Children: 4, including Lance Sieveking
- Relatives: Edgar Giberne (brother) Gerard Manley Hopkins (cousin)

Isabel Giberne Sieveking (c. 1857 – 30 March 1936) was a British suffragette, historian and writer.

== Early life ==
Sieveking was born in 1857 in Epsom, Surrey, and was raised as a devout Catholic. She was the youngest of the four children born to George Sieveking and Maria Sieveking Giberne. Her first cousin was the poet and priest Gerard Manley Hopkins.

== Marriage ==
When she was 33 years old, Sieveking married 25 year old timber-merchant Edward Gustavus Sieveking on 25 April 1891. She referred to him as "dear Ted". They lived in Harrow and Hastings.

They had four children:

- Valentine Edgar Sieveking (1892–1918)
- Geoffrey Edward Sieveking (1893–1979)
- Lancelot Giberne Sieveking (1896–1972)
- Elinor Beatrice Sieveking (1898–1989)

Sieveking's public views on marriage were radical and she wrote to the Hastings and St. Leonard's Observer on 3 December 1910 that "The highest ideal was not marriage. It could not be when sex was purely temporal." In the 12 July 1913 issue of the suffragette magazine The Awakener, Sieveking argued that marriage cannot satisfy women's desires for close companionship in an article titled "The Celibate Englishwoman."

== Activism ==
Sieveking was a suffragette and member of the Women's Social and Political Union (WSPU). She participated in the 1911 census boycott, with the enumerator writing on her return: "Husband had left the town when I called and the wife, who is a suffragette, refused to sign as correct". She also wrote to local newspapers and got caught up in the 1913 Hastings riots when antisuffragists attacked a group of suffrage campaigners on the seafront.

When Levetleigh House in St. Leonards-on-Sea was burned down by suffragettes, Sieveking was not involved, but did support the act.

She was the secretary of the local branch of the Parents' National Educational Union.

== Works ==
Autumn Impressions of the Gironde by Sieveking

Sieveking was also a historian and writer who published works concerning historic individuals and the Indian Rebellion of 1857:

- Memoirs and Letters of Francis W. Newman, London: K. Paul, Trench, Trubner & Co. (1909)
- A Turning Point in the Indian Mutiny (1910), dedicated to Thomas Gisborne Gordon
- Autumn Impressions of the Gironde (1910)
- The Memoirs of Sir Horace Mann, London: K. Paul, Trench, Trubner & Co (1912)
- The Great Postponement (1912)

She also published in academic journals such as The Antiquary.

== Death ==
Sieveking died on 30 March 1936 at Queen’s Gate, Kensington, London, England.
