= Maria Giberne =

French-English artist and convert to Roman Catholicism

Maria Rosina Giberne (1802−1885) was a French-English artist and convert to Roman Catholicism.

== Early life ==
The seventh of thirteen children, Giberne was born in Clapton, London in 1802, the daughter of wine merchant Mark Giberne and Rebecca Sharp. Her brother George Giberne married Maria Smith, an aunt of Gerard Manley Hopkins, and her sister Sarah married Walter Mayers, an Anglican clergyman who taught and influenced John Henry Newman. She became part of Newman's social circle, and his brother Francis Newman proposed marriage to her twice.

== Work ==
Giberne spent the late 1840s and 1850s in Rome working as an artist, living first with the Colonna and then the Borghese families. She produced portraits in chalk and then in oils, of members of those families and of subjects including John Henry Newman, Henry Wilberforce, and Pope Pius IX. When John Henry Newman was raised to the cardinalate, she produced a portrait of Saint Francis de Sales for his private chapel. Giberne professed vows as a sister of the Visitation at the convent in Autun, France, in 1863, taking the name Maria Pia in honour of Pius IX. She died at the convent in 1885.
