= Edwin Abbott Abbott =

British theologian and author (1838–1926)

The Reverend Edwin Abbott Abbott FBA
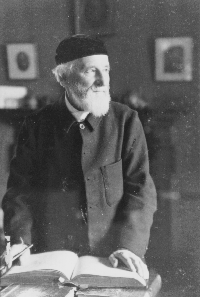
- Born: 20 December 1838; Marylebone, London, England
- Died: 12 October 1926 (aged 87); Hampstead, London, England
- Education: City of London School; St John's College, Cambridge
- Occupations: Teacher, author
- Known for: Flatland
- Father: Edwin Abbott

Edwin Abbott Abbott (20 December 1838 – 12 October 1926) was an English schoolmaster, theologian, and Anglican priest, best known as the author of the novella Flatland (1884).

== Early life and education ==
Edwin Abbott Abbott was the eldest son of Edwin Abbott (1808–1882), headmaster of the Philological School, Marylebone, and his wife, Jane Abbott (1806–1882). His parents were first cousins.

He was born in London and educated at the City of London School and at St John's College, Cambridge, where he took the highest honours of his class in classics, mathematics and theology, and became a fellow of his college. In particular, he was 1st Smith's prizeman in 1861. (Note: This seems to be an error by Venn: Colby's preface to Abbott's Flatland states that Abbott was 7th Senior Optime, Senior Classic and 1st Chancellor's Medallist in 1861; William Steadman Aldis was 1st Smith's Prizeman in 1861.)

== Career ==
In 1862 he took orders. After holding masterships at King Edward's School, Birmingham, he succeeded G. F. Mortimer as headmaster of the City of London School in 1865, at the early age of 26. There, he oversaw the education of future Prime Minister H. H. Asquith. Abbott was Hulsean lecturer in 1876.

He retired in 1889, and devoted himself to literary and theological pursuits. Abbott's open-minded inclinations in theology were prominent both in his educational views and in his books. His Shakespearian Grammar (1870) is a permanent contribution to English philology. In 1885, he published a life of Francis Bacon. His theological writings include three anonymously published religious romances – Philochristus (1878), where he tried to raise interest in Gospels reading, Onesimus (1882), and Silanus the Christian (1908).

More weighty contributions are the anonymous theological discussion The Kernel and the Husk (1886), Philomythus (1891), his book The Anglican Career of Cardinal Newman (1892), and his article "The Gospels" in the ninth edition of the Encyclopædia Britannica, embodying a critical view which caused considerable stir in the English theological world. He also wrote St Thomas of Canterbury, His Death and Miracles (1898), Johannine Vocabulary (1905), and Johannine Grammar (1906).

Abbott also wrote educational textbooks, one being Via Latina: A First Latin Book which was published in 1880 and distributed around the world within the education system.

=== Flatland ===
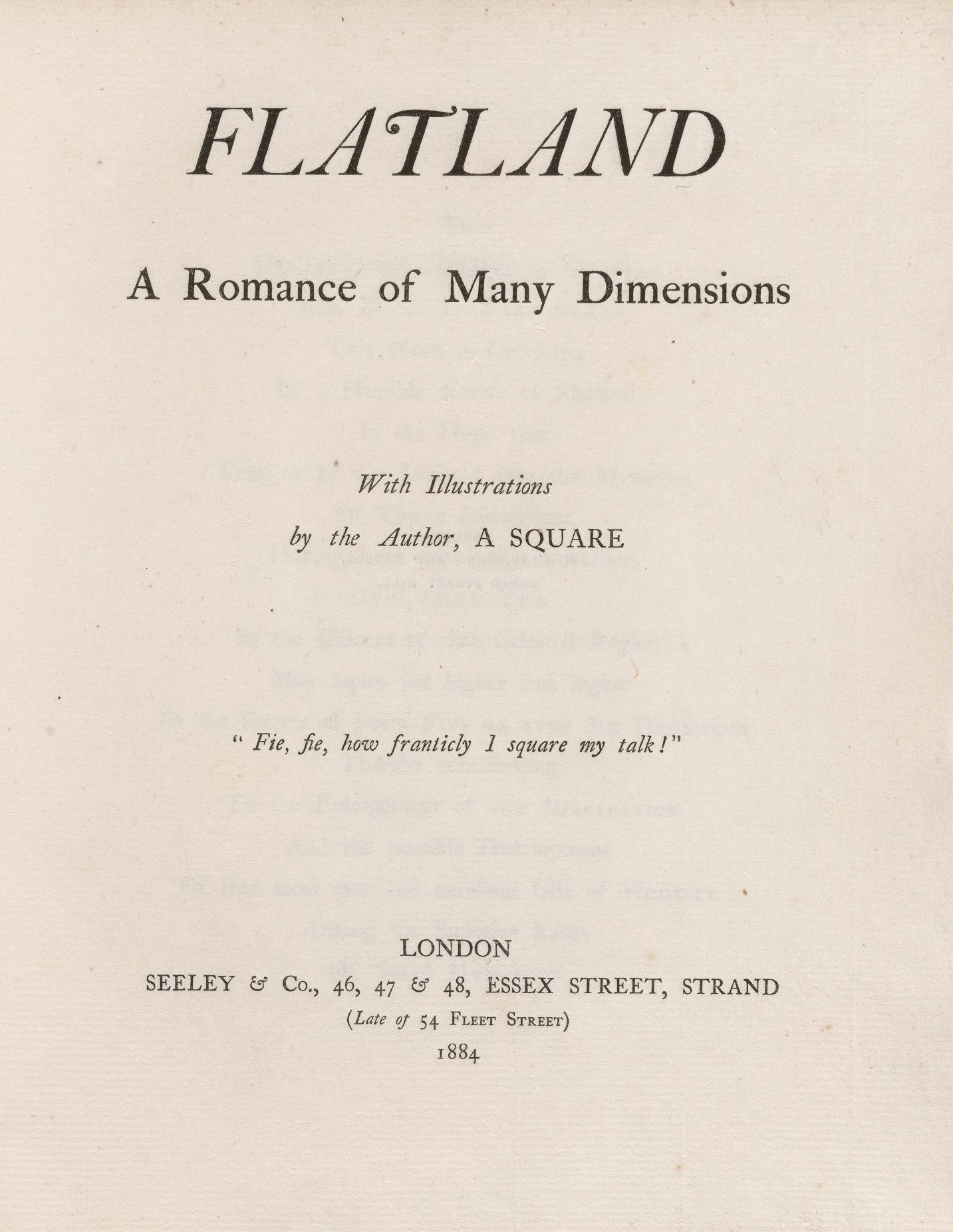
Flatland title page, 1884

Abbott's best-known work is his 1884 novella Flatland: A Romance of Many Dimensions which describes a two-dimensional world and explores the nature of dimensions. It has often been categorized as science fiction although it could more precisely be called "mathematical fiction".

With the advent of modern science fiction from the 1950s to the present day, Flatland has seen a revival in popularity, especially among science fiction and cyberpunk fans. Many works have been inspired by the novella, including novel sequels and short films.

== Bibliography ==
- Via Latina: A First Latin Book, Including Accidence, Rules of Syntax, Exercises, Vocabularies and Rules for Construing (Seeley, Jackson, and Halliday, revised edition: 1882)
- Shakespearian Grammar: An Attempt to Illustrate Some of the Differences Between Elizabethan and Modern English, for the Use of Schools (Macmillan, 1870)
- A concordance to the works of Alexander Pope (Chapman & Hall, 1875)
- Flatland: A Romance of Many Dimensions (Seeley & Co., 1884)
- Francis Bacon: An Account of His Life and Works (Macmillan, 1885)
- Philochristus: Memoirs of a Disciple of the Lord (Macmillan, 1878)
- Onesimus: Memoirs of a Disciple of St. Paul (Macmillan, 1882)
- The Kernel and the Husk (Macmillan, 1886)
- Philomythus: An Antidote Against Credulity (Macmillan, 1891)
- The Anglican Career of John Henry Newman|Cardinal Newman (Macmillan, 1892)
- St Thomas of Canterbury: His Death and Miracles (Adam and Charles Black, 1898)
- Diatessarica (Black, 1900–1917. 10 volumes)
  - Indices to diatessarica (1907)
  - Part I: Clue. A guide through Greek to Hebrew scripture (1900)
  - Part II: The corrections of Mark. Adopted by Matthew and Luke (1901)
  - Part III: From letter to spirit. An attempt to reach through varying voices the abiding word (1903)
  - Part V: Johannine vocabulary. A comparison of the words of the fourth gospel with those of the three (1905)
  - Part VI: Johannine grammar (1906)
  - Part VII: Notes on New Testament criticism (1907)
  - Part VIII: "The son of man" or contributions to the study of the thoughts of Jesus (1910)
  - Part IX: Light on the gospel from an ancient poet (1912)
- Silanus the Christian (Adam and Charles Black, 1906)
- The FourFold Gospel: or, A Harmony of The Four Gospels in five volumes, 1913–1917
  - Volume I: Introduction, 1913
  - The fourfold gospel, Section I: Introduction (1905)
  - The fourfold gospel, Section II: The beginning (1914)
  - The fourfold gospel, Section 3: The proclamation of the new kingdom (1915)
  - The foufold gospel, Section 4: The law of the new kingdom (1916)
  - The fourfold gospel, Section 5: The founding of the new kingdom or life reached through death (1917)

== See also ==
- List of Old Citizens
