= List of schools in the City of London =

This is a list of schools in the City of London.

== State-funded schools ==
=== Primary schools ===
- The Aldgate School (Church of England voluntary aided primary school, Aldgate)

== Independent schools ==
=== Primary and preparatory schools ===
- Charterhouse Square School (private primary school, Barbican)
- St Paul's Cathedral School (preparatory school, City of London)

=== Senior and all-through schools ===
- City of London School (independent boys school, City of London) City Of London
- City of London School for Girls (independent girls school, City of London) Barbican
- David Game College (independent school, City of London)

== See also ==
- List of former schools in the City of London
