= Warren Stormes Hale =

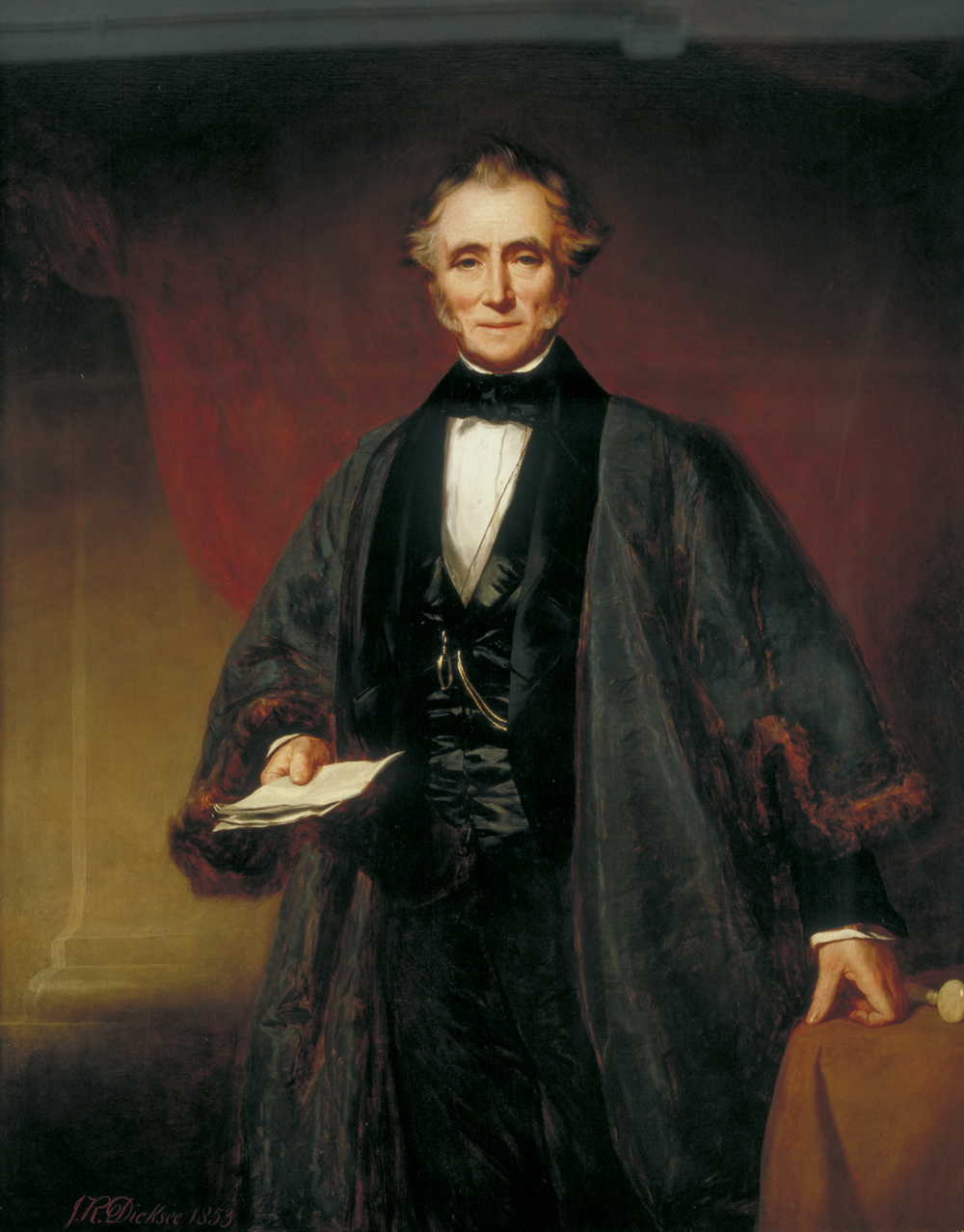
John Robert Dicksee: Portrait of Warren Stormes Hale, 1853

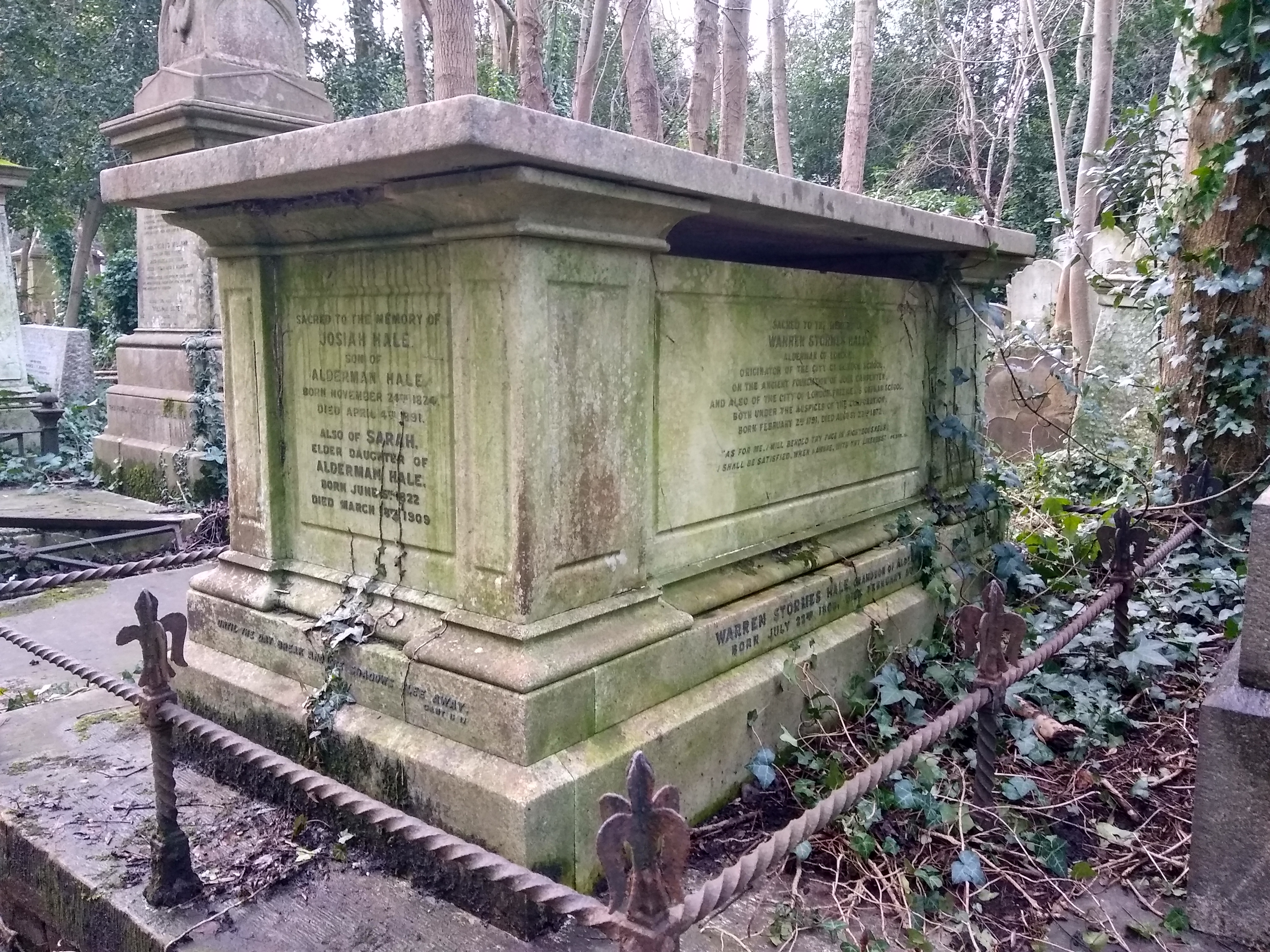
Family grave of Warren Stormes Hale at Highgate Cemetery

Warren Stormes Hale (1791–1872) was Lord Mayor of London and founder of the City of London School.

== Early life ==
He was born on 2 February 1791, was orphaned and became an apprentice candlemaker or chandler; he was later twice Master of the Tallow Chandlers' Company.

== Career ==
He was elected to the Common Council of the City of London in 1825, as an Alderman in 1856. he later became Sheriff in 1858 and Lord Mayor in 1864.

He is regarded as the second founder of the City of London School, responsible for using the surplus from the bequest of its original founder, John Carpenter.

== Death ==
He died on 23 August 1872 and is buried at Highgate Cemetery (West).

== Sources ==
- Lord Mayors, Aldermen and Common Councilmen in the Victorian City of London

Civic offices
Preceded by Sir William Lawrence	Lord Mayor of London; 1864 – 1865	Succeeded by Sir Benjamin Phillips
