= Onesimus: Memoirs of a Disciple of St. Paul =

1882 novel by Edwin Abbott Abbott

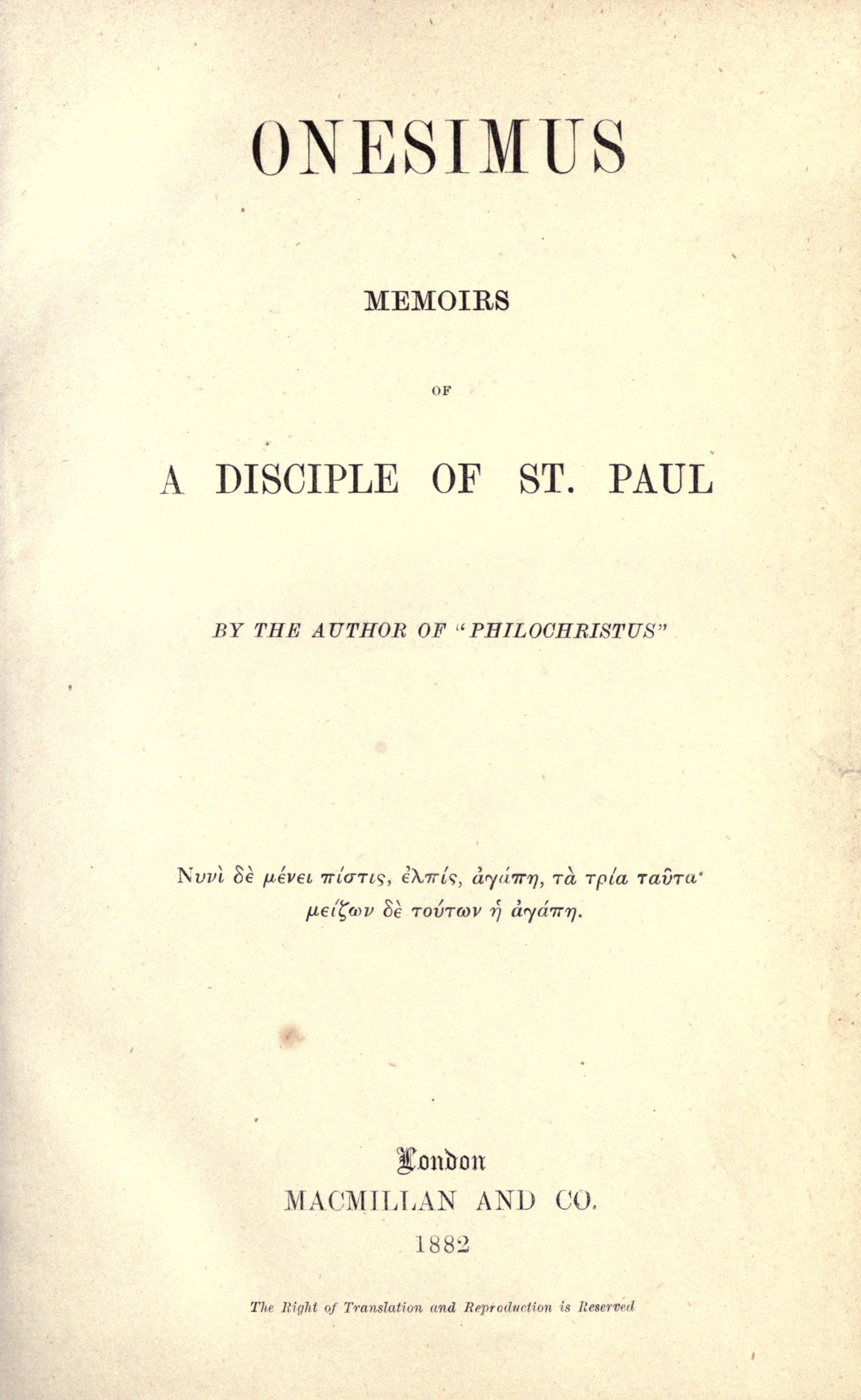
- Title page for Onesimus: Memoirs of a Disciple of St. Paul (1882)
- Author: Edwin Abbott Abbott
- Language: English
- Genre: Fiction
- Published: 1882
- Publisher: Macmillan
- Publication place: UK
- Pages: 311

Onesimus: Memoirs of a Disciple of St. Paul is an 1882 novel by Edwin Abbott Abbott. It is narrated by the proto-Christian Onesimus. It is written with the prose of the King James Bible translation of Acts of the Apostles. It recounts Onesimus' entire life, his travels with St. Paul, and his relation to Philemon.
