= Edwin Abbott (educator) =

English educator

- Born: 12 May 1808; London, England
- Died: 27 May 1882 (aged 74); Upper Norwood, London, England
- Occupation: Educator

Edwin Abbott (12 May 1808 – 27 May 1882) was an English educator.

Abbott was born in London in 1808, the son of Edward Abbott, an oilman and Italian warehouseman descended from George Abbot, archbishop of Canterbury. In 1827 he was made headmaster of the Philological School of General Instruction, Marylebone, the school he had himself attended. As a headmaster he was known as firm but humane. He married his first cousin Jane Abbott (1806–1882) in 1831. The couple had eight children, including Edwin Abbott Abbott, author of Flatland; a daughter, Elizabeth, married John Humffreys Parry.

Abbott's social concern led him to keep up contact with the Christian Socialists. He translated the third volume of J. H. Merle D'Aubigné's history of the reformation, wrote textbooks on Latin, English grammar and arithmetic, and published a concordance to Alexander Pope.

Abbott retired as headmaster in 1872, and died at Upper Norwood in 1882. The school was renamed St Marylebone Grammar School in 1901, and one of the four senior houses was named after Abbott.

== Works ==
- (tr.) History of the Great Reformation, by J. H. Merle D'Aubigné, vol. 3, 1841
- Handbook of Arithmetic and First Steps in Algebra
- A Handbook of English Grammar, 1845
- A Second Latin Book, 1858
- A concordance to the works of Alexander Pope, 1875 Online version at the Internet Archive
