= City of London School =

Private day school in London, England

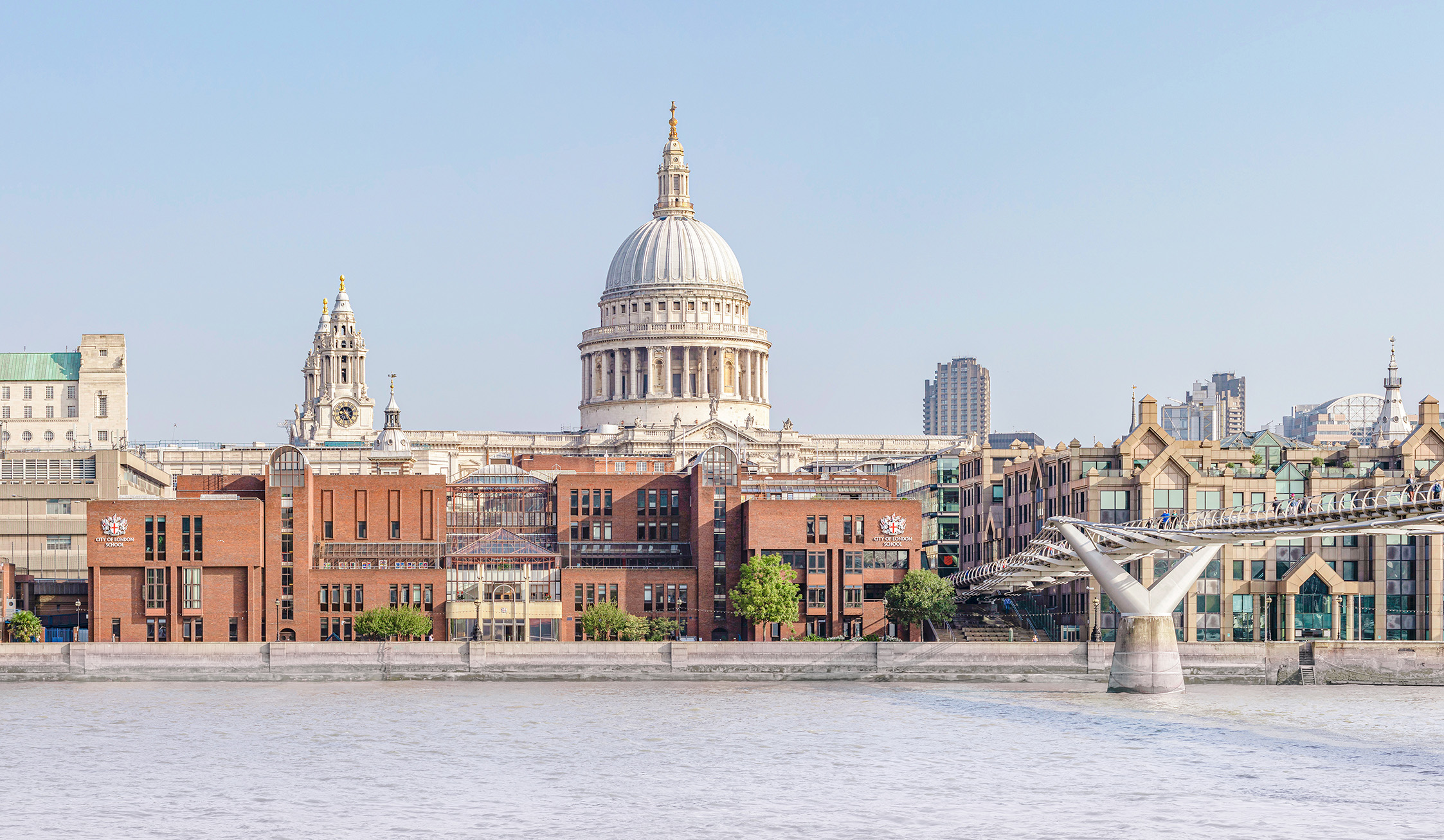
- The City of London School from the South Bank

Location
- 107 Queen Victoria Street; London, EC4V 3AL; United Kingdom; 51°30′41″N 00°05′56″W

Information
- Type: Public school Private day school
- Motto: Latin: Domine Dirige Nos
- Established: 1442; 584 years ago
- Founder: John Carpenter
- Sister school: City of London School for Girls
- Department for Education URN: 100003 Tables
- Chair of The Board of Governors: Tim Levene
- Head: Alan Bird
- Staff: 122
- Gender: Boys
- Age: 10 to 18
- Enrolment: 1018~
- Houses: Abbott, Beaufoy, Carpenter, Hale, Mortimer, Seeley
- Publication: The Citizen (weekly); The Review (termly); The Chronicle (annual)
- Alumni: Old Citizens
- Affiliations: City of London Corporation; HSBC; The Rifles
- Endowed: 1442
- Website: www.cityoflondonschool.org.uk

City of London School, also known as CLS, is a private day school for boys in the City of London, England, on the banks of the River Thames next to the Millennium Bridge, opposite Tate Modern. It is a partner school of the City of London School for Girls and the City of London Freemen's School. All three schools receive funding from the City's Cash. It is a member of the Headmasters' and Headmistresses' Conference (HMC).

The school was founded by a private act of Parliament, the Establishment of Honey Lane Market School Act 1834 (4 & 5 Will. 4. c. 35 Pr.), following a bequest of land in 1442 for poor children in the City of London. The original school was established at Milk Street, moving first to the Victoria Embankment in 1879 and subsequently to its present site on Queen Victoria Street in 1986.

Former pupils, known as Old Citizens, who have attained eminence in various fields are former UK Prime Minister H. H. Asquith, First World War hero Theodore Bayley Hardy, Nobel Prize–winning scientists Frederick Gowland Hopkins and Peter Higgs, Justice of the Supreme Court Lawrence Collins, Historian John Robert Seeley, England cricket captain Mike Brearley, chemist and entrepreneur William Henry Perkin, Booker Prize-winning authors Kingsley Amis and Julian Barnes, film director Michael Apted, and actor Daniel Radcliffe.

The school provides day education to about 1,000 boys aged 11 to 18 and employs approximately 100 teaching staff and around another 100 non-teaching staff. The majority of pupils enter at 11, some at 13 and some at 16 into the Sixth Form. Admissions are based on an entrance examination and an interview, with the exception of pupils educated at the City Junior School, who are given an automatic place at 11+.

== History ==
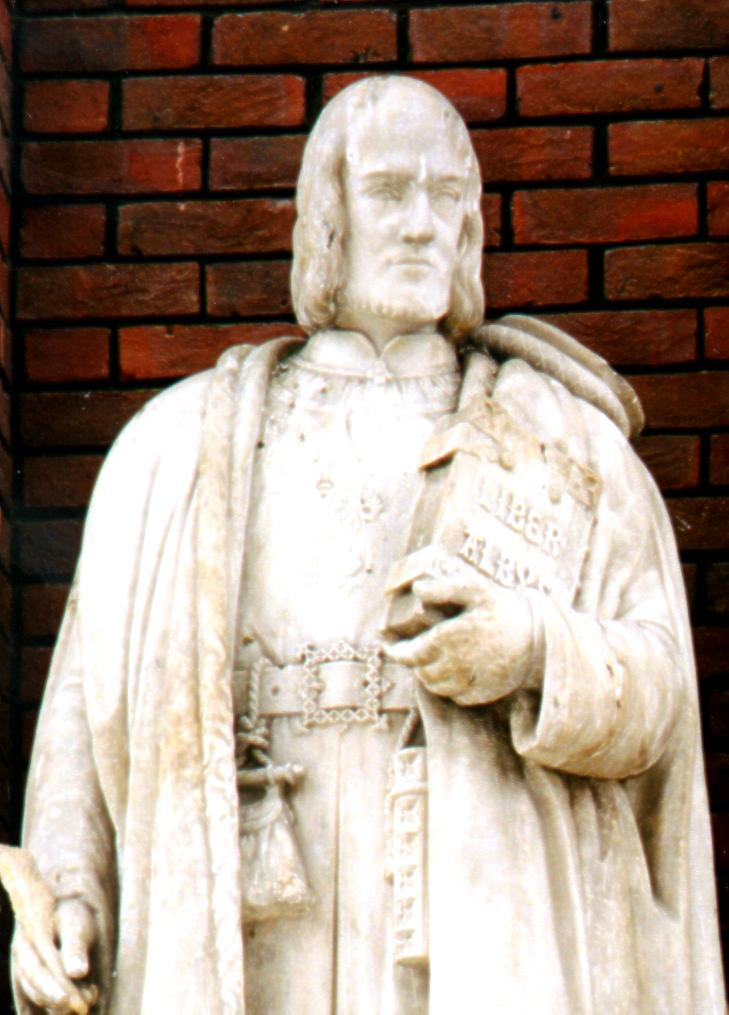
Statue of John Carpenter (1372–1442) by Samuel Dixon situated on the wall of the City of London School's glassed ceiling atrium standing over the door to the balcony of the Great Hall. In this position he 'sees' the full splendour of St. Paul's Cathedral Dome.

The City of London School traces its origins to a bequest of land by John Carpenter, town clerk of London. On his death in 1442, it was found that Carpenter had listed many bequests, most to his relatives but some to charitable causes. There were no bequests listed to directly support the education of boys in the City of London. However, a bequest of land was left to two trusted friends who were aware that Carpenter desired a legacy which would support children, and in turn the land was passed on to John Don, an influential man in the City of London. On his death, Don left his own will incorporating the words used in Carpenter's bequest of land and his intentions for the land, that it be "for the finding and bringing up of four poor men's children with meat, drink, apparel, learning at the schools, in the universities, etc., until they be preferred, and then others in their places for ever." The four boys became known as Carpenter's Children.

Little is known of the early years of the legacy. This bequest was administered by the Corporation of London in around 1460 and a small college was founded next to Guildhall Chapel, also using the library facilities in the chapel. Despite the fact that this continued for over 70 years, the earliest certain evidence of the existence of Carpenter's Children can only be traced back to 1536, and thus it is not clear who these boys were, what they were taught and where they lived. In 1547, under the Chantries Act 1547 the Guildhall Chapel and Library were forfeited. The funding for the four boys was also discontinued. The Corporation of London remained in control of Carpenter's estate and accounts from the next 300 years show that the money continued to be spent on children's benefits such as providing new coats to every child or providing them with access to education.

In 1823, a report published by the Charity Commission revealed that over the centuries, the income from the bequest vastly exceeded the expenses of the boys' education. In response to the report, the Corporation of London indicated that it had taken, "great pains...by searching in the archives of the corporation and other places for the will of John Carpenter, without effect". Had the Corporation instead looked for the will of John Don, it would have received guidance in what to do with the money.

Lacking that guidance, discussions began on how the bequest money should be spent. The City Lands Committee suggested in a report that the bequest should be spent on educating a larger number of boys and this approach was adopted in 1826. A number of people including Richard Taylor, a printer and an assistant to the founding of University College London, urged the Corporation of London to spend the bequest on creating a day school for the largest possible number of boys. In 1830, they proposed that the City of London Corporation School should be founded with Taylor as a governor and that the school to be established on the site of the disused London Workhouse. In the meantime, a small number of boys, who became known as Carpenter's scholars, were sent to Tonbridge School. An act of Parliament, the Estate of the London Workhouse Act 1829 (10 Geo. 4. c. 43 Pr.), was passed to transform the workhouse into a school and governors were appointed. Conditions at the workhouse site had deteriorated and much money was needed for its maintenance. The only funds available, though, were the same £300 (about £30,000 in 2016) a year budget the workhouse had received.

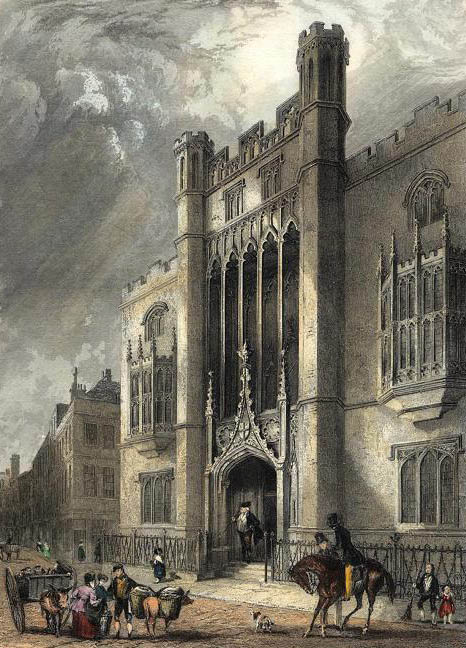
An 1830s print showing the school building of 1835–1883 in Milk Street.

Over the next few years, the workhouse proposal was seen by the City of London Lord Mayor's deputation and the City Lands Committee (Taylor was a member of both), as impractical, and other schemes were proposed. In 1832, Warren Stormes Hale, who believed that the workhouse proposal was not the best use of Carpenter's legacy, was appointed to the City Lands Committee. He became chairman of the committee in 1833, and would come to be considered the second founder of the City of London School, after Carpenter.

At this point, the City Lands Committee started to search for better locations for a school. They selected Honey Lane Market, a site on Milk Street, as their preferred location. However, this proposal faced the same funding difficulties as the workhouse proposal: only £300 per year was available, insufficient to build and maintain a school. This problem was not recognised until the bill to found the school reached the House of Lords. An altered bill was finalised in 1834, removing any references to the London Workhouse and addressing the Lords' objections.

Establishment of Honey Lane Market School Act 1834
- Act of Parliament
- Parliament of the United Kingdom
- Long title: An Act for establishing a School on the Site of Honey Lane Market in the City of London.
- Citation: 4 & 5 Will. 4. c. 35 Pr.

Dates
- Royal assent: 13 August 1834

Text of statute as originally enacted

The altered bill was passed as an act of Parliament, the Establishment of Honey Lane Market School Act 1834 (4 & 5 Will. 4. c. 35 Pr.). It was this act which founded the City of London School, which initially had around 400 pupils. The act gave the Corporation of London a duty to maintain a school on the Honey Lane Market site and so gave control over almost every aspect of the school's running to the corporation. A committee was also set up to manage the school, with Hale as chairman. Although the committee's powers were initially limited, they gained more control over time as they made important decisions for the school.

The act gave the new school an annual budget of £900 (around £107,000 in 2016) from the bequest while the governors of the City of London Corporation School, who still wanted to implement their original idea, gained nothing, only retaining the old workhouse income. Both Hale and the Corporation of London were also eager to create this second school, which the governors of the City of London Corporation School had proposed. Despite their efforts, the other school was not founded until 1854, as the Freemen's Orphanage School, in Brixton with Hale as chairman. The Freemen's Orphanage School still exists today as the City of London Freemen's School in Surrey.

=== Establishment at Milk Street ===
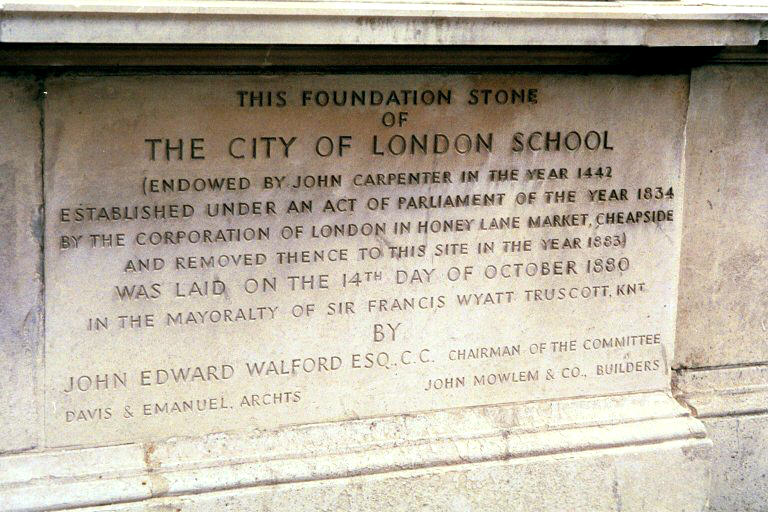
Foundation Stone of the City of London School

The foundation stone of the new school was laid by Lord Brougham at premises in Milk Street, in the City of London near Cheapside, on part of the site of the old Honey Lane Market, in 1835 and the school opened its doors in 1837.

The school was remarkable for its time in several respects. It did not discriminate against pupils on the grounds of religious persuasion (at a time when most public schools had an Anglican emphasis); it included pupils from non-conformist and Jewish families. Also, unlike other established independent schools, it was a day school (although there were in early days a handful of boarders, no boarding department ever became established). It also promoted a practical and progressive scheme of education which was well ahead of its time. It was the first school in England to include science on the curriculum and to include scientific experiments as part of its teaching. It also offered education in commercial subjects. This did not, however, diminish its teaching in the subjects traditionally favoured by the traditional public schools, and it sent classical and mathematical scholars to Oxford and Cambridge throughout the 19th century. These included the classicist, theologian and Shakespearean scholar Edwin Abbott Abbott (whose mathematical exploration of a world in other than three dimensions, Flatland, is still in print and who returned to the school as headmaster), John Robert Seeley – a classics scholar who became Regius Professor of Modern History at Cambridge University and H. H. Asquith, who though educated as a classical scholar went on to become the British Prime Minister.

=== Move to Blackfriars ===
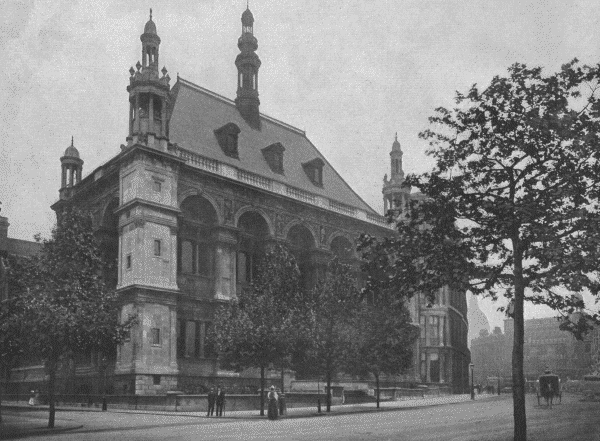
City of London School – An early photograph of the school building of 1883–1986

The school eventually outgrew its original site. While some public schools moved away from Greater London in the late 19th century, the management and committee of City of London jointly decided to stay in the capital, as it was deemed a stimulating environment for education. A City of London School Act 1879 (c.63) empowered the school to move to a new site in the City of London at Blackfriars on the Victoria Embankment overlooking the Thames. The school moved in 1883 and the new building was opened by the Prince of Wales, (the future King Edward VII). In 1887 the Divisional Court and the Court of Appeal determined that the City of London School was a public school.

In November 1912, the Education Committee appointed Cyril Burt as a psychologist in the education officer's department. In Britain, this was the first appointment in a field of psychology outside a university. From 1913 to 1931 Burt examined pupils nominated for admission to special schools. His mandate included selection and research.

In 1920, an arrangement was made whereby all the boy choristers of the Temple Church were given scholarships at the City of London School. In 1926, this arrangement was extended to the boy choristers of the Chapel Royal at St. James's Palace. The choristers included Ernest Lough, whose recording of Mendelssohn's "O for the Wings of a Dove" with the Temple Choir in 1927 made him world-famous; by 1962 it became the first classical record to sell more than a million copies. Another musician educated at the school was the cellist Steven Isserlis.

=== Second World War ===
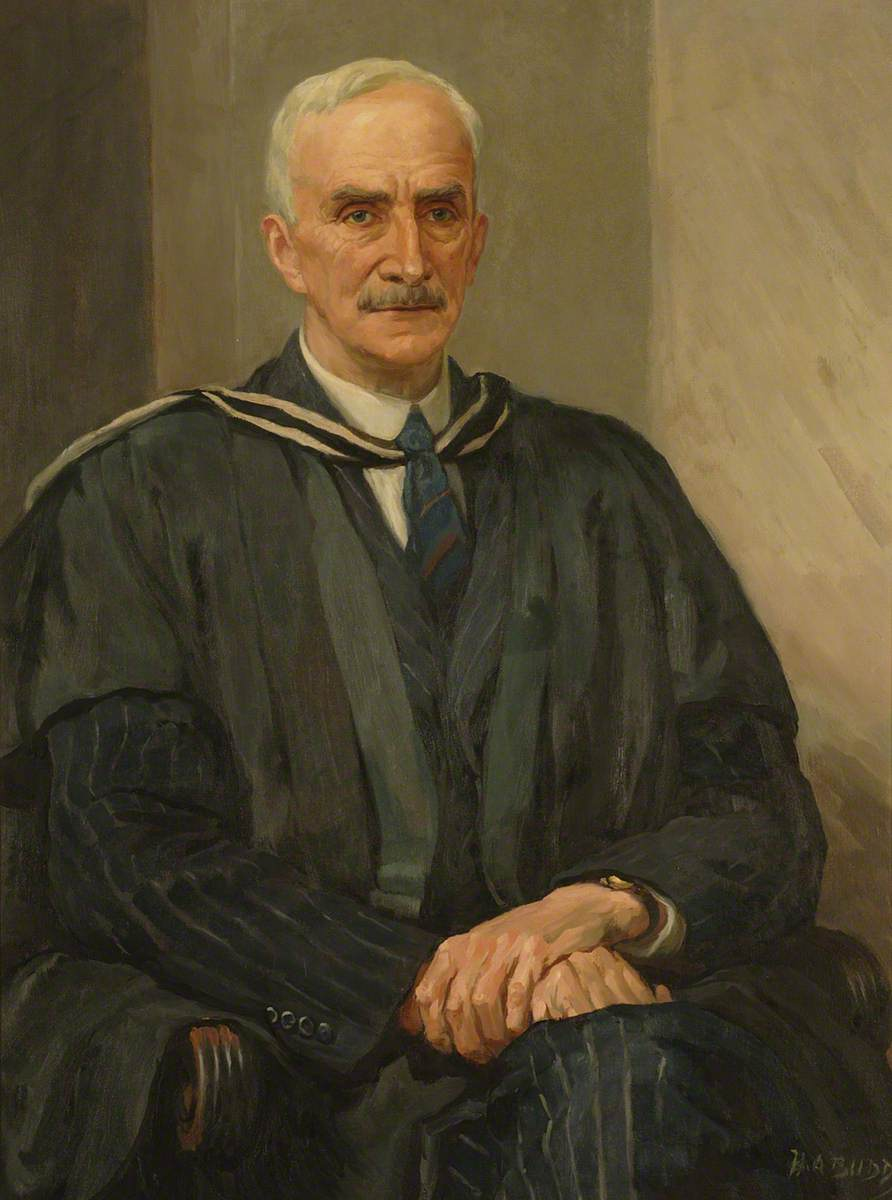
Headmaster Francis Dale (painting by Herbert Ashwin Budd)

In 1938, the headmaster F.R. Dale made an agreement with George Turner, headmaster of Marlborough College, to evacuate the school there, if it became necessary. On 1 September 1939 following the German invasion of Poland and the start of the Second World War, the majority of the school were sent to Marlborough College by train.

Accommodation was not provided in the agreement with Marlborough College and so Turner wrote to the Mayor of Marlborough to request accommodation in town. Many of the accommodation billets were occupied by soldiers and women working for the Ministry of Health at the time and so for the first night, the boys slept in the gymnasium of the school, before moving into the town's billets the following night.

When the Marlborough term began, an arrangement was made whereby City of London boys had lessons during games for Marlborough College pupils and vice versa. The difficulties at the Marlborough location ranged from finding a study for Headmaster Dale to finding enough kitchen staff to prepare food for both schools. Resources were limited and outbreaks of influenza and rubella were common. Like many other schools evacuated into the countryside, the City of London School's enrolment fell from 700 to 430 during the war, although no pupil was killed or injured as a direct result of enemy fire.

The arrangements at Marlborough College gave pupils the opportunity to strengthen the school's clubs and societies. This included a dramatic society, in which Kingsley Amis played a large part.

Marlborough College itself experienced some threat from the war. The Ministry of Aircraft Production had also relocated there, and in 1942, bombs fell nearby. By 1944, with the war settling down, the City of London School returned to its home on the Victoria Embankment, which had suffered no structural damage during the Blitz. Air raid shelters were built on site as a precautionary measure.

Soon after the building reopened, a bomb fell on the nearby Law Courts, and the staff sent pupils home for a week. However, some pupils were due to take public exams. After Marlborough College refused them permission to take the exams there, it was decided that boys would take the Higher Certificate papers in the Guildhall Crypt.

It took the school over five years to recover from the effects of the war. Many Old Citizens had been killed in the war. Today, there is a memorial in the school's courtyard (transplanted from the main staircase of the old Blackfriars site) to Old Citizens who were killed in either of the World Wars. An annual remembrance service, involving members of the Combined Cadet Force, is held on the Friday closest to Armistice Day in November.

=== Modernisation and move to Queen Victoria Street ===
The school underwent many changes during its time on the Victoria Embankment. The curriculum had been consolidated at the turn of the century, the Combined Cadet Force was modernised, the house system had been reorganised, the "mission", what is now the annual charity appeal, had been started and a Community Service Organisation had been set up as an alternative to the Combined Cadet Force. It was compulsory for a boy, above the third form, to serve in one of these organisations for at least three years (later reduced to five school terms). This is a tradition which still exists today. In 1925, the school acquired its sports grounds at Grove Park, Lewisham. This site included a pavilion, containing offices, changing rooms, toilets and showers, which was designed, by Old Citizen Ralph Knott, to also be a memorial to those Old Citizens who had lost their lives in the First World War. When J. A. Boyes became headmaster in 1964, further modernisations were made in the building. As the number of pupils increased over the years, overcrowding became a problem. Headmaster Boyes believed that a new, modern building was needed for the school, and his efforts managed to secure a site on the banks of the River Thames for a new facility.

In 1986, the City of London School moved to its present site in purpose-built facilities in Queen Victoria Street (where it is opposite the College of Arms and just below St Paul's Cathedral) on one side and facing onto the banks of the River Thames on the other side. School activity transferred to the new premises over the 1986 summer holidays, in time for the 1986–1987 academic year, and a ceremony for the official opening of the building, by the Princess Anne, was held in 1987. The Millennium Bridge is next to the school buildings.

== Buildings ==
=== Milk Street (1837–1883) ===
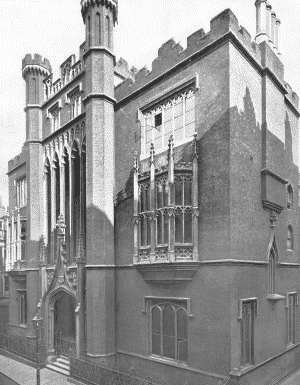
An early photograph of the Milk Street building used by the school in 1837–1883

The original building at Milk Street was designed by architect J.B. Bunning, who was the architect to the City of London. The building was designed in a neo-Gothic Tudor style.

=== Victoria Embankment (1883–1986) ===
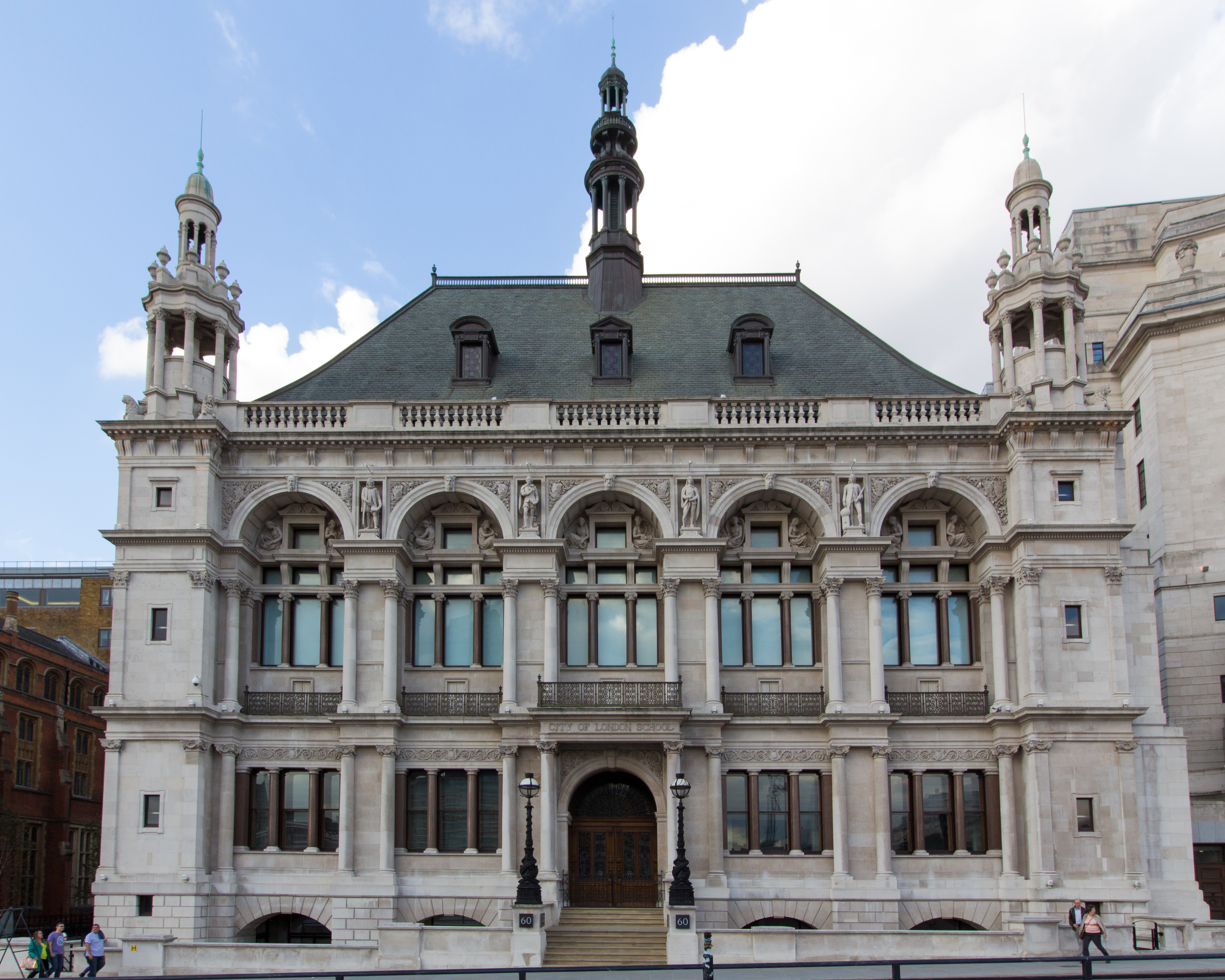
A modern (2015) photo of the Victoria Embankment building used by the school in 1883–1986

The Victoria Embankment building, a grand building said to be in the Italian Renaissance style but actually in a high Victorian style with a steep pitched roof resembling that of a French chateau, was designed by Davis and Emanuel and constructed by John Mowlem & Co. at a cost exceeding £100,000 (about £11,158,064.52 in 2016). The designers designed the school as "amazingly unscholastic, rather like a permanent Exhibition Palace."

On the front of the building are statues of Shakespeare, Milton, Bacon, Newton and Sir Thomas More with "the first four emphasising the school's literary and scientific traditions [and] the last being a religious martyr, a famous lawyer and the author of Utopia."

The building remained the home of the City of London School for a hundred years, although the site expanded to include not only the original building on the Victoria Embankment itself, but a range of buildings at right angles along the whole of John Carpenter Street, which was named after the founder of the school, and further buildings constructed at the back along Tudor Street, with the school playground, Fives courts and cloisters enclosed within the site. These other buildings were demolished when the school moved again in 1986. Here the school was adjacent to the City of London School for Girls, which was founded by the City of London Corporation as a sister school in 1894 and moved in 1969 to its present site in the Barbican, and the Guildhall School of Music and Drama which has also since moved to the Barbican. It was also next to the traditional home of the British newspaper industry in Fleet Street.

This building still stands and is protected by a preservation order; as of 2017 it was occupied by the investment bank JPMorgan, and it appeared on the left of the famous Thames Television ident from 1968 to 1989. The building still features the school's name above the door. The auxiliary buildings in John Carpenter Street and Tudor Street, however, were demolished shortly after the school vacated the premises.

=== Queen Victoria Street (1986–present) ===
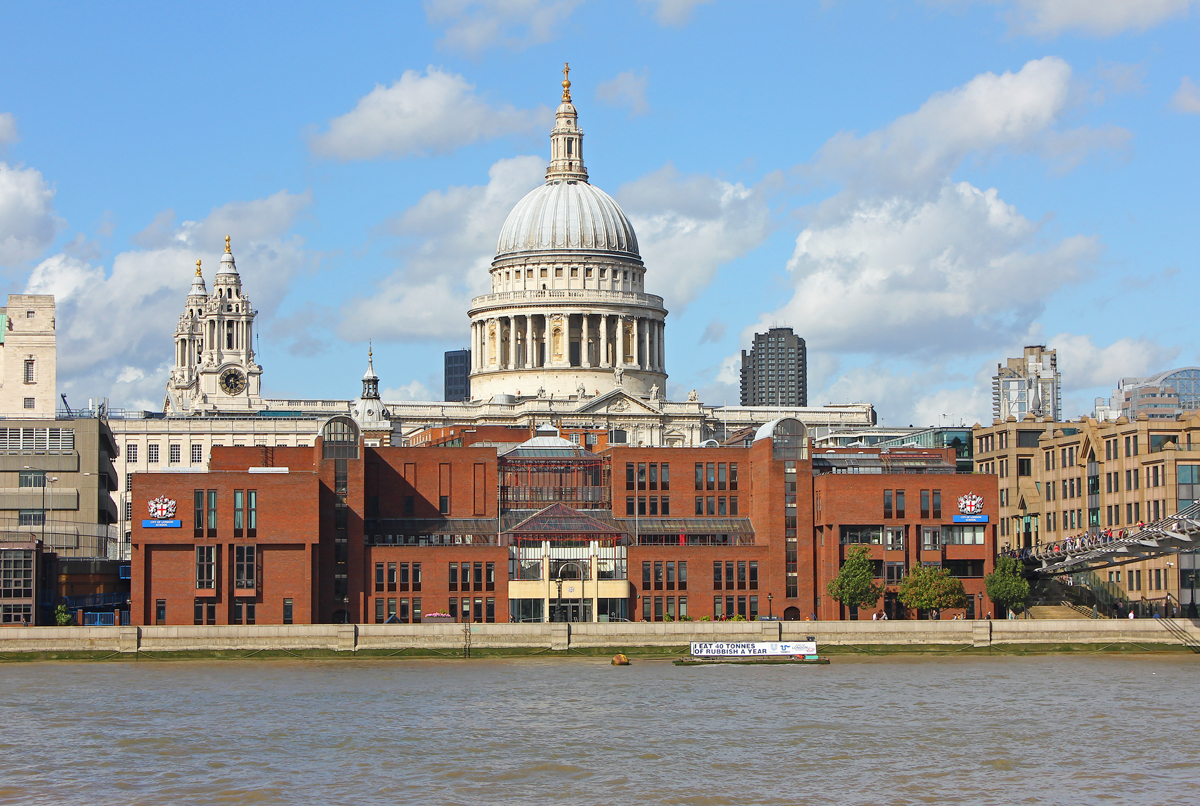
The modern red-brick building on Queen Victoria Street, used by the school since 1986.

The present building on Queen Victoria Street was designed by City of London architect Thomas Meddings, an Old Citizen of the school as well as a former Temple Church chorister. It is a wholly modern building, although some of the stained glass and sculptures from the Victoria Embankment building has been relocated to this new building. A design and technology block was added to the building in 1990, though in 2008, the block was transformed into a building mainly used by the ICT and music departments, although some design and technology facilities remain. The building was designed on a structural grid and non-load bearing walls were used so that the internal layout of the building could easily be changed when necessary. The school's design is also slightly unusual in that it was built avoiding a road tunnel in the centre of the premises. This meant that the first and second floors of the building could only be built on either side of the road tunnel. The load on the third floor directly above the road tunnel is also limited and so there is a courtyard which goes up to the fifth floor, surrounded by the building, in that area. The current building is opened to the public annually on one weekend in September as part of the Open House London event.

In 2020, an international two-stage competition was announced for a £19 million revamp of the present City of London School building. The competition, which has been organised by New London Architecture on behalf of the City of London Corporation, will select the entry that brings an 'innovative and sustainable' upgrade to the building complex. The project represents a part of an overall plan to expand capacity at the school. The contract was won by a joint proposal from Morris & Co. and Freehaus.

The front view of the building beside the River Thames with St Paul's Cathedral in the background and the Millennium Bridge on the right is occasionally seen in media such as in the BBC News 60-second countdown as well as in an early scene of the 2005 movie, The Constant Gardener and in the 2009 film Harry Potter and the Half-Blood Prince.

== School life ==
=== Houses ===
City of London School has six Houses: Abbott, Beaufoy, Carpenter, Hale, Mortimer, and Seeley. As well as houses named after the founder of the school John Carpenter and former headmasters Edwin Abbott and George Mortimer, they include houses named after important Old Citizens or school benefactors including Beaufoy, a philanthropist who donated the sum of £10,000 (about £660,000 in 2016) in the 18th century, Hale who played a significant role in the school's founding and Seeley, a famous historian who attended the school. Boys are assigned to a House in the Third Form (13 years old), in which they stay throughout their school career. There are inter-house events (e.g. sports, literature, maths) which contribute points to an overall Interhouse Competition that is decided at the end of the year, of which the reigning 2023-24 champions are Mortimer House.

=== School uniform ===
The school requires school uniform for all pupils up to the fifth form. Sixth formers do not have to wear uniform, but are required to wear suits and the sixth form school tie.

=== Curriculum ===
In 2019, The Daily Telegraph placed the school eighth in its League Tables of Independent School A-level results, with 81.2% of entries gaining A* or A grades at A-level. The Telegraph also placed it 6th for GCSE results, with 94.62% of papers graded 9-7 (A*-A in the old system). As of 2017 around 35 pupils took up places at Oxbridge each year.

Pupils are required to take a minimum of ten GCSE subjects in the fourth and fifth form of which six, mathematics, English Language, English literature, biology, chemistry and physics are chosen for all students. Of the remaining four options, one must be a humanity and another a modern foreign language. Additionally, one GCSE subject may be dropped in favour of the Higher Project Qualification (HPQ) offered in design, computing and robotics lessons, the GCSE level equivalent of the Extended Project Qualification (EPQ). Additional subjects and qualifications are taken by some students. In 2007 the school also started offering IGCSE in some subjects.

In the sixth form, boys take either three or four subjects at A-level, or three subjects and an Extended Project Qualification (EPQ). Subjects on offer include Geography, History and Politics, Economics, Mathematics, Language and Literature, Music, Modern Languages, Chemistry, Biology, Physics, Drama and Theatre, Classical Civilization, Latin & Greek, Design and Visual Arts, Religious Education, Information Technology and Physical Education. There is also a programme of PSHE, and games at all levels, and an ICT programme for the first and second forms.

=== Extracurricular activities ===
The school offers many extracurricular activities. These include over 50 clubs and societies including a Model United Nations, public speaking and debating society which frequently participates in international competitions; the Square Mile Club, which in the past has attracted notable speakers such as Sir Trevor Macdonald, Brian Paddick, Sir David Pepper and Ian Livingston; and even a student-founded Star Wars Society. Boys themselves can create and manage clubs, with school funding available for activities. There are also trips, opportunities to carry out community service and a Combined Cadet Force. The school also gives boys the opportunity to receive instrumental tuition as well as join music groups including orchestras and choirs. The school also offers sports including football, cricket, basketball, water polo, swimming, sailing, fencing, squash, badminton, fives, athletics, cross-country, judo, karate and indoor rowing. Most of these sports take place on school facilities. Sports such as sailing and climbing take place on non-school facilities. Boys also represent the school in competitions at varying levels.

The school has a tradition of supporting a charity, chosen by the boys through a ballot, each academic year. The fundraising activities are coordinated by the boys and events take place throughout the year to raise money for the selected charity. An average of £50,000 is raised each year.

=== Facilities ===
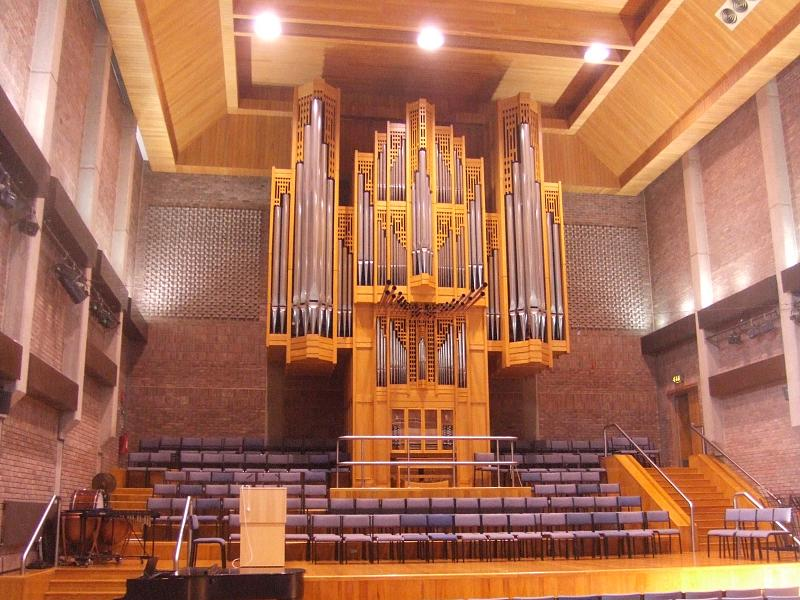
The Great Hall stage and Walker organ, originally designed for the Victoria Embankment school building.

The school's sports facilities include a multi-purpose indoor sports hall, a 25-metre swimming pool, a gym, a rooftop AstroTurf football pitch and grass playing fields and athletics tracks at Grove Park, Lewisham. Music facilities include three ensemble rooms, ten rehearsal rooms and a music technology lab. Other facilities include the Great Hall, a sixth form common room, a bookshop, a library, an archive room, three ICT labs, facilities for the Combined Cadet Force (including a rifle range), a drama studio, two playgrounds and a drama theatre. The Great Hall houses a Walker organ which was moved from the previous school building and put into a new casing. The organ has 3 manual departments, 61 notes and a pedal department with 32 notes as well as 43 stops, 4 tremulants and 6 couplers. The drama theatre (Winterflood Theatre) was rebuilt in 2009 at a value of £1.3 million. The project was jointly funded by City entrepreneur Brian Winterflood and the City of London Corporation. The new theatre was designed by architectural firm RHWL and built by Wilmott Dixon Construction.

=== Traditional events ===
Some traditional events are held annually, although attendance is no longer compulsory. This includes the annual prize giving ceremony at Guildhall, London and the annual carol service at Temple Church, among others. The school is also home to the annual London Classical Reading Competition, participated in by schools nationwide. Another traditional event is "muck-up day" celebrated by the leaving year group at the end of formal schooling in their final year at the school. In 2015 this attracted police attention when plans to bring in paint for "raucous" celebrations led to concerns about disruption to the city's financial district. The headmistress barred the year group from school grounds "for their own safety", and told them that any such behaviour would result in their UCAS forms being "ripped up".

=== Governance ===
Today, the City of London School's policies are maintained by a board of governors. It continues to be under the governance of the City of London Corporation (the governing body of the City of London headed by the Lord Mayor of the City of London, as opposed to Greater London, as well as an independent corporation). The school is under the governance of the City of London Corporation's corporate arm as opposed to its Local Authority arm.

The school is one of the three independent secondary schools owned by the City of London Corporation, the other two being the City of London School for Girls and the City of London Freemen's School. The City of London School for Girls located in the Barbican is a fifteen-minute walk away from the school and there are joint events, such as social evenings, concerts and plays, with the school throughout the year.

== School fees ==
Although the City of London School has always charged fees to most of its pupils, it has always offered scholarships, both on the basis of academic and musical ability (it educates ten boys selected for the Choir of Her Majesty's Chapel Royal). In 2008, the school began offering sports scholarships. After the withdrawal of the Government Assisted Places scheme in 1998, the school has offered full-fee bursaries (or Sponsored Awards) to pupils from families on lower incomes with the help of contributions from parties including private companies, the John Carpenter Club, the City of London Corporation, and parents of current pupils. In 2014, at a time when 82 boys at the school received bursaries of 100% of the annual fees of £14,313, the previous head Sarah Fletcher said that her decision to take up the position had been influenced by the school's generous bursary schemes, partly because her own grandfather had enjoyed a life-changing opportunity when given an educational bursary many years before.

For the 2024–25 academic year, the annual school fees were £23,655 and lunch was an extra £355 a term (£1,065 a year). Music lessons were an additional £343 a term (£1,029 a year).

== Charitable status ==
The school has six charities registered with the Charity Commission. These are The City of London School Bursary Fund which contributes to the funding of the bursary schemes, The City of London School Bursary Trust which provides bursaries to boys who have gained admission to the school but whose parents cannot afford the fees, The City of London School Scholarships and Prize Fund which allows the school and other parties to offer scholarships, prizes or sponsored awards to current or former pupils without incurring taxes, The City of London School War Memorial Fund which was originally established to support boys affected by the World Wars but now supports means-tested bursaries at the School, The City of London School Charitable Trust which is the annual charity appeal and The City of London School Education Trust which exempts the school from taxes as an independent school providing education for pupils within the school, as well as providing educational and recreational facilities for children and young people in the surrounding communities.

== Notable people ==
Many distinguished people have been part of the school either as pupils (see List of Old Citizens) or staff.

Notable recent pupils include the actors Daniel Radcliffe from Harry Potter movies; Skandar Keynes of The Chronicles of Narnia film series; Joe Alwyn of The Favourite; and Harry Michell of Tom Brown's Schooldays and Feather Boy.

Jonathan Keates, a prize-winning writer, was an English master at the school. Sheila Gallagher was honoured for her service as a lollipop lady at the crossing to the school on Queen Victoria Street, in 2002.

Old boys of the City of London School are known as Old Citizens. they may join the John Carpenter Club. Over 140 people listed in the Oxford Dictionary of National Biography were educated at the City of London School, and that includes only those who were already deceased at the time of writing.

== Headmasters ==
The school has had thirteen headmasters. The first was John Allen Giles, a scholar of Anglo-Saxon history and a Fellow at Corpus Christi College, Oxford, who also wrote a number of scholarly works, including the 34 volume Patres ecclesiæ Anglicanæ. Giles was however, "temperamentally unsuited" to be headmaster of the school, and was replaced by George Ferris Whidborne Mortimer, a liberal who had written an anti-slavery pamphlet. Mortimer's religious tolerance led him to open the school to boys from Jewish families. He was replaced in 1865 by a former boy, Edwin Abbott Abbott, author of Flatland. Abbott oversaw the education of future prime minister H. H. Asquith, before retiring in 1889 to devote himself to literary and theological pursuits.

Arthur Chilton was appointed headmaster in 1905, an appointment he held for 24 years and throughout World War One, until 1929. In 1950 Arthur W. Barton, a scholar and football referee, took over as headmaster until 1965. Martin Hammond was head from 1984 to 1990. David R. Levin, who was also the chair of the Headmasters' and Headmistresses' Conference for the 2009–2010 academic year, held the position from 1999 to 2014. He left the school in January 2014 to become the managing director of all the independent schools owned by United Learning. In May 2014 he was succeeded by Sarah Fletcher, who had been the head of Kingston Grammar School. Gary Griffin had been acting as head in the interim. She left to join St Paul's Girls' School. In January 2018, Alan Bird replaced Sarah Fletcher as head.

== See also ==
- List of the oldest schools in the United Kingdom
- List of Old Citizens of the City of London School
- List of schools in City of London
- List of schools in England
