= List of Old Citizens =

Old boys of the City of London School are called Old Citizens. The school's old boy association is called the John Carpenter Club after John Carpenter, town clerk of London, whose bequest led to the founding of the school. This list is not comprehensive; over 140 people listed in the Oxford Dictionary of National Biography, which includes only people dead at the time of publication, were educated at the City of London School.

== Notable Old Citizens ==
Many of those listed are cited in the Dictionary of National Biography.

- Edwin Abbott Abbott – Headmaster of the school (after whom Abbot house is named), theologian and author
- David Lindo Alexander – Jewish community leader
- Joe Alwyn – Actor
- Kingsley Amis – Writer
- William Anderson – Physician, Anatomy professor and scholar of Japanese Art
- Michael Apted – Actor, producer and director
- Thomas Walker Arnold – Orientalist
- Lord Ashby – Botanist and 5th Chancellor of Queen's University Belfast
- H. H. Asquith – Prime Minister 1908–1916
- Roy Baker – Film director
- Hugh Lewis – Antique furniture Restorer
- Julian Barnes – Novelist
- Jonathan Barnes – Philosopher
- Aaron Barschak – Comedian
- Henry Charles Beeching – Poet
- Samuel L Bensusan – Author and expert on country matters
- David Blundy – War Correspondent, killed in El Salvador, 17 November 1989
- Bramwell Booth – 2nd General of the Salvation Army
- Mike Brearley – Cricketer, captain of the England cricket team 1977–1981 and whose father Horace Brearley taught at CLS
- Clive Brooks – Member of the band Egg
- Arthur Henry Bullen – Publisher and scholar
- Kenneth Callow – Biochemist
- Mont Campbell – Member of the band Egg
- Suma Chakrabarti – Senior Civil Servant
- Lord Chalmers – Colonial governor and minister
- Sir Paul Chambers – Industrialist, Chairman of ICI
- Danny Cohen – New Controller of BBC One, and formerly of BBC Three
- Lord Collins – Supreme Court justice
- MJ Cole – UK Garage DJ, record producer and remixer.
- Robert Seymour Conway – Classical scholar and philologist
- Jim Cousins – Labour MP
- Jack Crawford – Professional NFL Player, Oakland Raiders
- Philip Dawid – Statistician
- John Diamond – Journalist and broadcaster, & Sunday Times writer
- Edward Divers – Chemist
- Lord Evans – Royal physician
- Stewart Farrar – Author
- Henry Charles Fehr – Sculptor
- John Knight Fotheringham – Historian, an expert on ancient astronomy and chronology
- Percy Gardner – Archaeologist
- Edward Garnett – Editor and writer
- Leo Genn – Stage and film actor
- Roland Glasser – Literary translator
- Israel Gollancz – Founding member of the British Academy
- Yvon John Guillermin – Film director, producer and writer.
- Theodore Bayley Hardy – Victoria Cross holder
- Sam Hield Hamer – Editor and writer
- Sir Nicholas John Hannen – Chief Justice of the British Supreme Court for China and Japan and British Consul General, Shanghai
- Peter Higgs – Nobel Prize–winning theoretical physicist, predicted the so-called "God Particle" known as the Higgs boson
- Frederick Hopkins – Nobel Prize winning biochemist
- Paul Hough – Film Director
- William Huggins – Astronomer
- Joseph Oscar Irwin – Statistician
- Steven Isserlis – Cellist
- Benedict Jacka – Novelist
- Francis Jacobs - Advocate General of the European Union
- Tim Jackson – Entrepreneur and author
- Anthony Julius – Lawyer
- Skandar Keynes – Film Actor
- David Klenerman - Professor of biophysical chemistry
- Paul Klenerman - Olympic fencer and professor of immunology
- Ralph Knott – Architect
- Peter B. Kronheimer – Mathematician
- Brian Lapping - Journalist
- James Leasor – Author
- Sidney Lee – Editor of the Dictionary of National Biography
- Anthony Lester – Lawyer
- Peter Levene – Chairman of Lloyd's of London and Lord Mayor of London 1998 & 1999
- Joseph Hiam Levy – Author, economist, and prominent figure in the Personal Rights Association
- David M. Lewis – Professor of Ancient History, University of Oxford
- Sir Patrick Linstead – Chemist and Rector of Imperial College London
- David Litman – American Entrepreneur, founder of hotels.com
- Ernest Lough – Boy soprano, singer, whose recording of Mendelssohn's "O for the Wings of a Dove" with the Temple Choir in 1927 made him world-famous; it had sold one million copies by 1962, the first classical record to reach this figure.
- Sir Wylie McKissock – Neurosurgeon
- Luke McShane – Chess Grandmaster
- Lord Mishcon – Solicitor and politician who represented Princess Diana in her divorce. Home affairs spokesman in the House of Lords from 1983 to 1990 and shadow Lord Chancellor 1990–1992.
- Neil Morisetti – UK Climate and Energy Security Envoy
- Edwin Montagu - British 'Radical' Liberal Politician, Anti-Zionist, former Secretary of State for India, 3rd Practising Jew to hold a cabinet position
- Max Newman – Mathematician and World War II codebreaker
- George Newnes – Publisher and editor
- Denis Norden – Writer and broadcaster
- John Owen – Senior Civil Servant & Cabinet Office Chief Technology Officer
- Richard Packer – Senior Civil Servant
- Robert William Paul – Pioneer of cinematography
- Howard John Stredder Pearce – Former Governor of the Falkland Islands and Civil Commissioner of South Georgia and the South Sandwich Islands (SGSSI)
- Mark Pears – British billionaire, CEO of William Pears Group
- Sir William Henry Perkin FRS – Chemist best known for his discovery of the first aniline dye mauveine at the age of 18.
- Henry Thomas Herbert Piaggio – Physicist
- Albert Profumo - Barrister
- Arthur Rackham – Illustrator
- Daniel Radcliffe – Actor best known for his role as Harry Potter in the Harry Potter series of film adaptations.
- Gervais Rentoul – Politician and first chairman of the 1922 Committee
- Charles Thomson Ritchie – Chancellor of the Exchequer 1902–1903
- Joshua Rose – England Hockey Player and comedian
- Leon Roth – Jewish Philosopher and founder of the Department of Philosophy at Hebrew University
- Edward Linley Sambourne – Punch cartoonist
- Michael Schwab – Professor of Public Health
- John Robert Seeley – Historian and essayist
- John Shrapnel – Film and stage actor
- Bernard Silverman FRS – Former Master of St Peter's College, Oxford, and Chief Scientific Adviser to the Home Office
- William Johnson Sollas – Geologist and anthropologist
- Colin Southgate – Businessman
- Dave Stewart – Keyboardist with the bands Uriel, Egg, Hatfield and the North, National Health, Bruford and Stewart / Gaskin.
- Edward Stanford – Mapmaker
- Alfred Sutro – Playwright
- Derek Taunt – Mathematician and cryptologist
- Sir Thomas Taylor – Chemist, academic, and university administrator.
- John Lawrence Toole – Actor and theatre manager
- Colonel Sir Neil Thorne – Conservative member of Parliament,
- Thomas Fisher Unwin – Publisher
- David Walker – Master of the Household
- Alan Arthur Wells – Structural engineer, developer of Wells turbine
- Sir Robert Stanford Wood – First Vice Chancellor of the University of Southampton

== See also ==
- Category:People educated at the City of London School
