= George Ferris Whidborne Mortimer =

English schoolmaster and divine

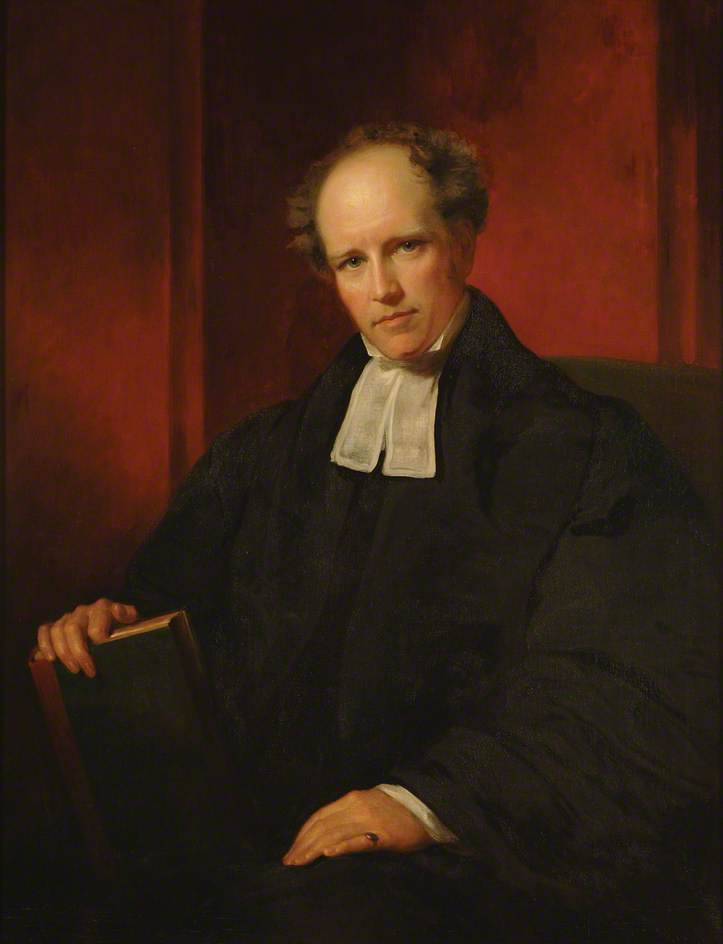
George Ferris Whidborne Mortimer by Eden Upton Eddis.

George Ferris Whidborne Mortimer (22 July 1805 – 7 September 1871) was an English schoolmaster and divine.

== Biography ==
Mortimer was born on 22 July 1805 at Bishopsteignton in Devonshire. He was the eldest son of William Mortimer, a country gentleman of that place. His family was connected to other Mortimers in the Teign valley. He was educated at the Exeter grammar school and Balliol College, Oxford, where he matriculated 18 March 1823, and obtained an exhibition.

Thence he migrated to Queen's, where he secured a Michel exhibition, and was placed in the first class of the final classical school at Michaelmas 1826 with the future archdeacon of Taunton, George Anthony Denison, and another. After graduating B.A. in 1826 he engaged actively in tuition. He proceeded M.A. in 1829, and D.D. in 1841, having been ordained on 24 February 1829.

He was, successively, head-master of the Royal Grammar School, Newcastle (from 1828) and of the Western proprietary school at Brompton, London (from 1833). In 1840, he was appointed, in succession to John Allen Giles, to the scene of his longest and most important labours, the headship of the City of London School.

The school opened in 1837, but its prosperity had been injured by the action of the first head-master. Mortimer's administrative ability and genial manner rendered the success of the school certain. He treated with conspicuous honesty and fairness the large proportion of boys, not members of the church of England, who from various causes were found there.

In 1861, he had the unique distinction of seeing two of his scholars respectively senior wrangler and senior classic at Cambridge. Charles Kingsley read privately with him for ordination. Mortimer received in 1864 the honorary prebend of Consumpta per mare in St Paul's Cathedral, and for many years was evening lecturer at St Matthew's, Friday Street. At Michaelmas 1865 he resigned his head-mastership, and for the next few years interested himself actively in the Society of Schoolmasters and other educational institutions.

He died 7 September 1871, at Rose Hill, Hampton Wick, and was buried in Hampton churchyard. He had married, in 1830, to Jane, daughter of Alexander Gordon of Bishopsteignton; and by this lady, who survived him, he left a numerous family.

Besides two sermons, Mortimer published while at Newcastle a pamphlet entitled "The Immediate Abolition of Slavery compatible with the Safety and Prosperity of the Colonies".
