= List of former schools in the City of London =

This is a list of defunct educational establishments within the city boundary of London. It does not include institutions endowed by city businesses, livery companies or churches that had their boundary outside the square mile. Where no data could be found the box is left blank.

Name of school	Pupil records	Estate records	Administrative records
Aldersgate Ward School of London	1889–1940	1823–1951	1700–1951
Aldgate Ward School	1800–1868	1723–1907	
Castle Baynard Ward School			1753–1835
City of London School Of Instruction and Industry, St James Dukes Place	1807–1845	1824	1806–1846
Coleman Street Ward Schools	1871–1917	1759–1913	1803–1939
Cordwainer and Bread Street Wards Charity School			1715–1727
Cornhill and Lime Street Wards Charity School		1849	1775–1818, 1872
Cripplegate within Ward Schools	1823–1833	1784–1822	1712–1892
Dissenters' Charity School	1807–1818		1804–1839
Farringdon within Ward Schools			1756–1884
Joye's (Peter) Charity School, St Ann Blackfriars	1705–1744	1611–1734	1707–1892
Neale's Mathematical School, St Dunstan in the West	1931–1940		1924–1954
Queenhithe Ward School			1847–1871
Ragged School Union	1860		
Ratcliff School, Ratcliff Highway		1520–1607	1823–1889
St Andrew Undershaft School		1634–1805	
St Anne and St Agnes Charity School			1770
St Bartholomew the Great Parochial School	1867–1872	1627–1918	1728, 1780–1932
St Botolph Bishopsgate Parochial Charity School			1758–1800
St Bride Fleet Street Parochial Charity School			1865–1949
St Dunstan in the West Parochial Charity Schools	1868–1940	1709–1934	1609, 1632, 1771–1949
St Giles Cripplegate Schools Foundation	1707–1748	1527–1852	1690–1905
St Sepulchre Holborn Parochial Charity Schools	1861–1924	1916	1700–1939
Tower Ward School	1872–1882	1846–1884	
Trotman's School, Bunhill Row	1844–1999		1827–1979
Turner's Free School For Poor Boys	1769–1979	1775–1835	1771–1990
Vintry Ward Charity School		1842, 1900–1901	1730
