= Gaston III of Foix =

French nobleman (1331–1391)

Gaston III
- Count of Foix; Viscount of Béarn; Viscount of Marsan; Prince of Andorra
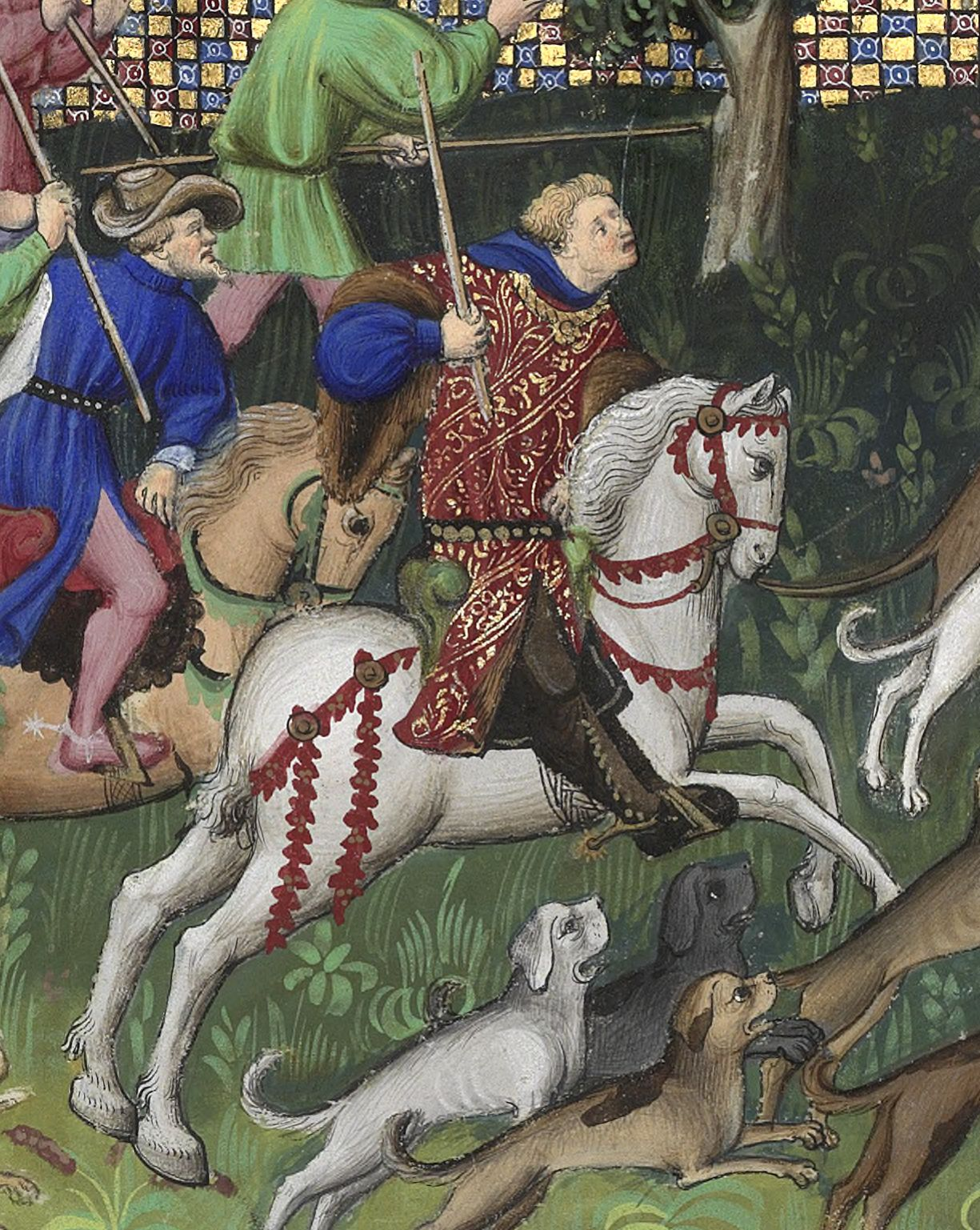
- Fébus hunting the hare, miniature by the Bedford Master, Livre de chasse, circa 1407, Paris, BnF, Fr.616, f° 89 v°.
- Predecessor: Gaston II, Count of Foix
- Successor: Matthew, Count of Foix
- Known for: Livre de chasse (Book of the Hunt)
- Born: 30 April 1331; Orthez, France
- Died: 1 August 1391 (aged 60); L'Hôpital-d'Orion
- Spouse: Agnes of Navarre (m. 1349; sep. 1362)
- Issue: Gaston; Bernal; Yvain of Foix
- Father: Gaston II, Count of Foix
- Mother: Aliénor of Comminges
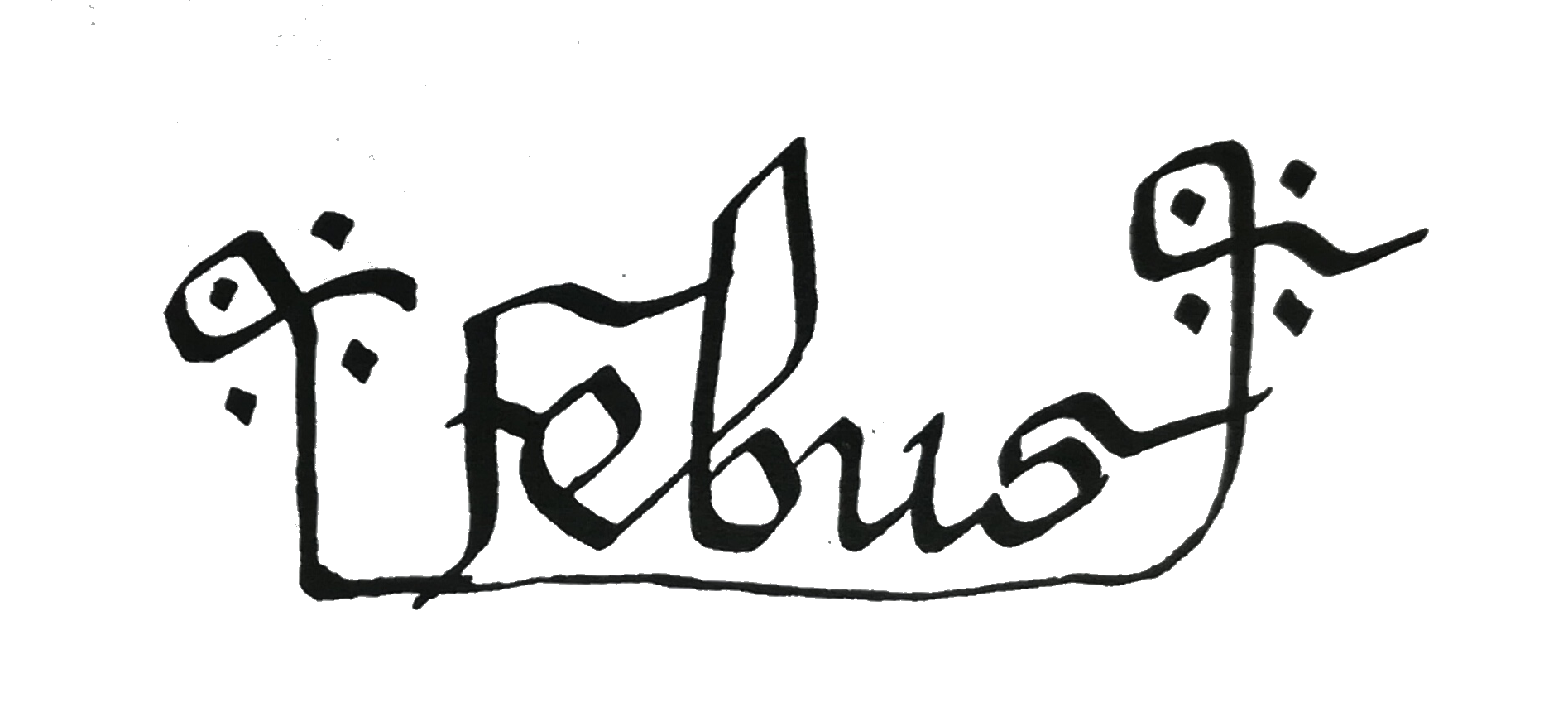
- Signature

Gaston III, known as Gaston Phoebus or Fébus (30 April 1331 – 1 August 1391), was the count of Foix (as Gaston III) and viscount of Béarn (as Gaston X) from 1343 until his death.

Gaston III was overlord of approximately ten territories located between Gascony and Languedoc. During the Hundred Years' War, he established his domination over the Pre-Pyrenees by playing on the conflicts between French and English monarchies. He authored the Livre de chasse, an illustrated manuscript on hunting. Gaston used the name Fébus, using the Occitan spelling, after a crusade in Prussia in reference to the Greco-Roman sun-god Apollo (known contemporaneously as Phoibos).

The only legitimate child of Gaston II, Count of Foix, and Aliénor of Comminges, Gaston inherited a fragmented territory that paid homage to the king of France as well as the king of England. During the Hundred Years' War, he claimed sovereignty over Béarn on 25 September 1347. He won decisive victories against the House of Armagnac (the ancestral enemies of his house), thus ensuring the union between Béarn and Foix. Gaston left no legitimate heir, as he likely killed his only legitimate son, Gaston, in 1380 for attempting to assassinate him.

Gaston constructed and strengthened several fortresses during his life. Endowed with immense wealth, Gaston III notably built the Château de Montaner to symbolize the union between Béarn and Foix. Known as the prince of the Pyrenees, Gaston ruled as an enlightened despot, playing the role of lord protector for his people. Gaston III is prominent in Pyrenean history due to his reign, but also from the accounts of various chroniclers and contemporaries, including Jean Froissart in his Chronicles.

== Life ==
=== Ancestry ===
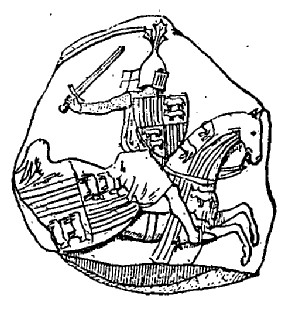
The seal of Gaston II of Foix-Béarn, father of Gaston III.

The future Gaston III, the only legitimate child of Gaston II of Foix-Béarn and Aliénor of Comminges, was heir to the House of Foix-Béarn. The House had been established through the 1252 marriage of Margaret of Béarn – daughter and heiress of Gaston VII, Viscount of Béarn – to Roger-Bernard III, Count of Foix. Since the reign of Gaston II, the family held the Viscounty of Lautrec and the lowlands of the Albigeois. (Note: Granted as a reward for assistance to King Philip VI of France at the start of the Hundred Years’ War.) The Foix-Béarn family was related to all the southern families of nobility in France at that time.

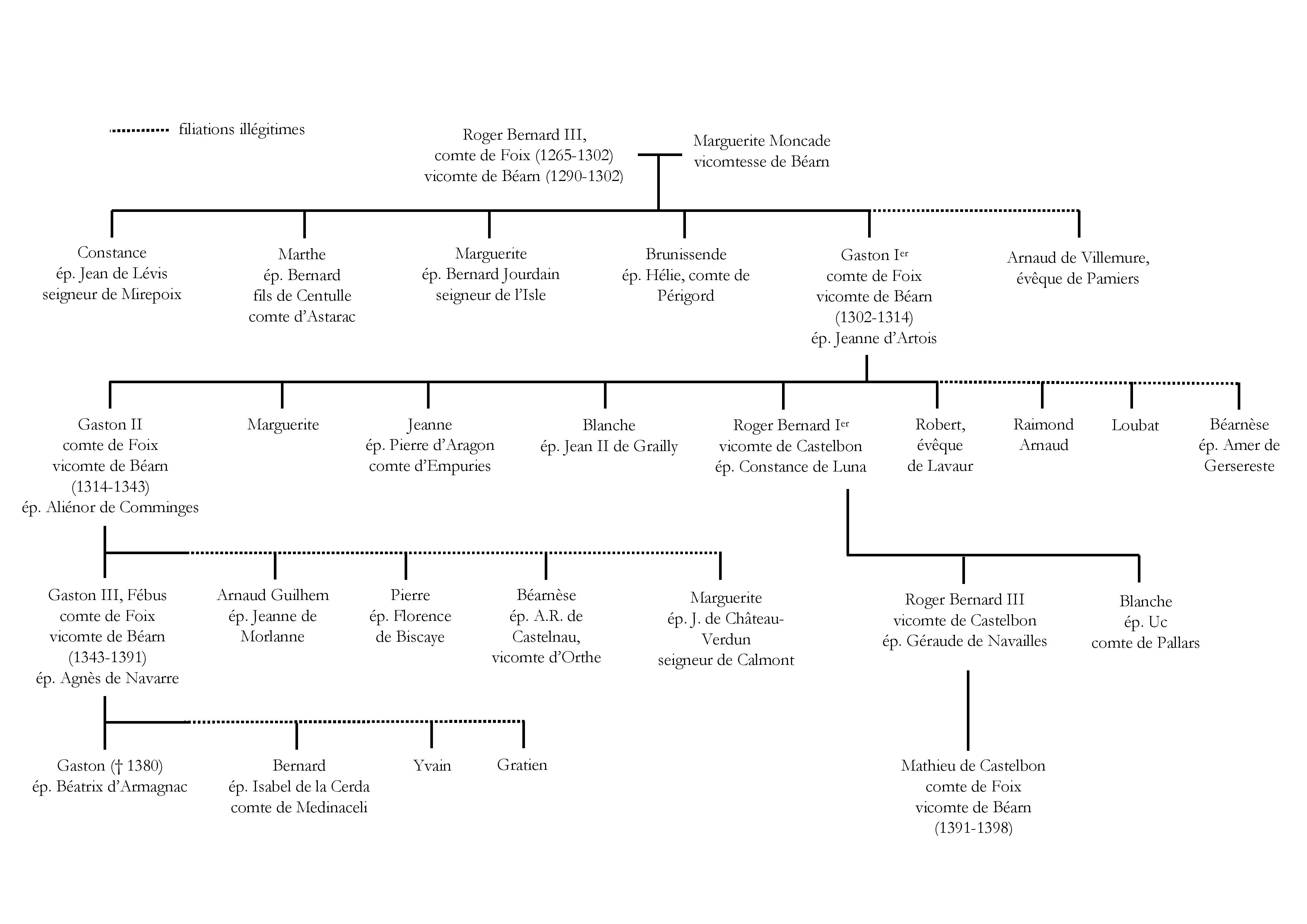
Gaston III's family tree, beginning at the marriage of Roger-Bernard III, Count of Foix to Margaret of Béarn.

Following Gaston VII's death in 1290, the House held a patchwork of territories along the Pyrenees. To the west lay Béarn, Marsan, Gabardan, and Captieux – forming part of the Duchy of Aquitaine. Further east lay territories held by the King of France. The County of Foix constituted the main component of this region and included Donezan; to the south, the Counts of Foix also served as co-princes of Andorra alongside the Bishops of Urgell. Finally, the House of Foix-Béarn controlled the small but strategic province of Nébouzan, positioned between the western holdings around Orthez and the eastern lands surrounding Foix.

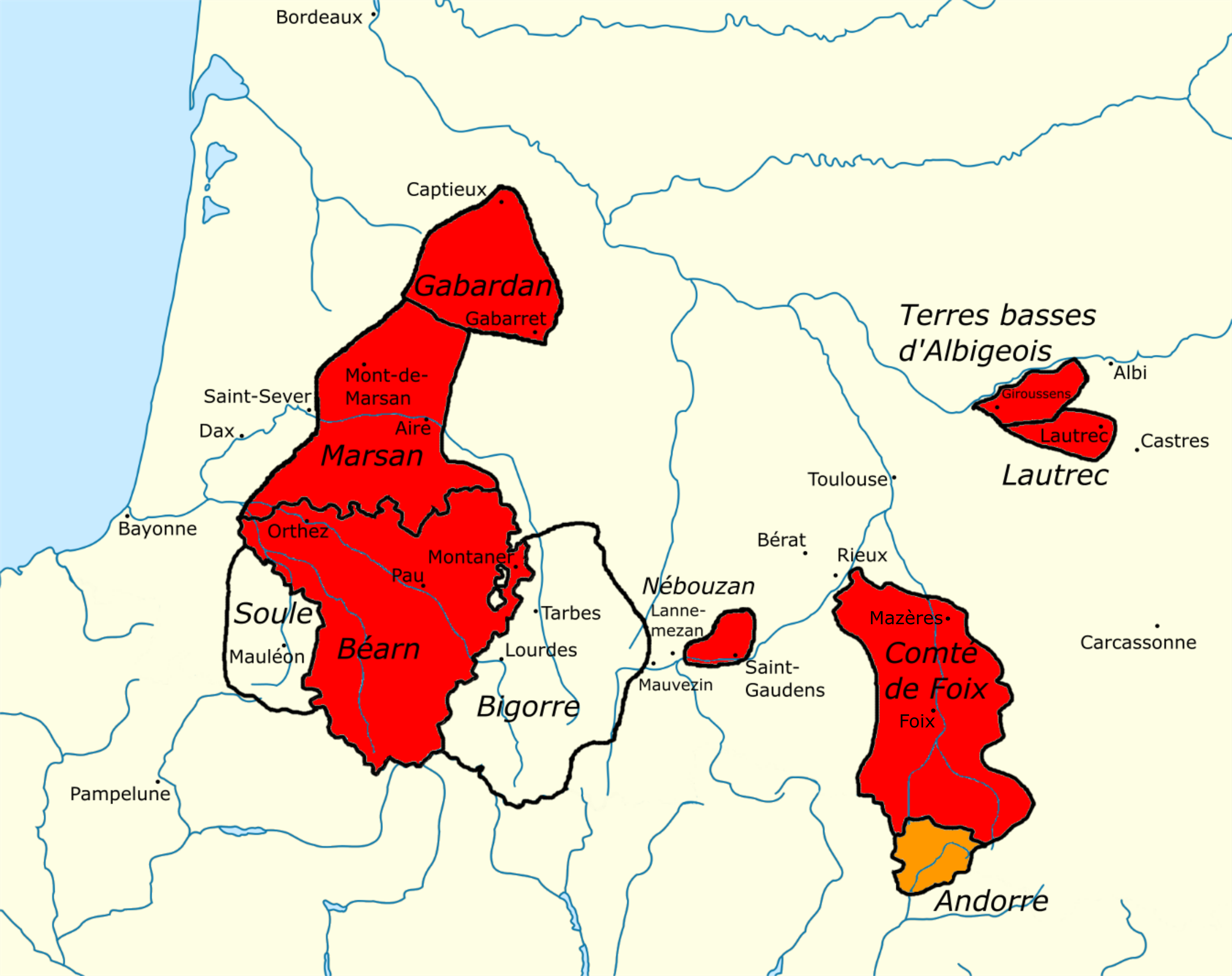
The domain of Gaston III of Foix-Béarn as it was in 1343.

Aliénor, youngest child of Bernard VII, Count of Comminges, had several of her children die in infancy. Approaching her forties when she gave birth to Gaston III, (Note: A high age in the Middle Ages, Aliénor was closer to the age of a grandmother of the time.) Though the marriage between Gaston II and Aliénor was not particularly warm, Gaston II still regarded his wife with respect and esteem.

==== Childhood and youth ====
Gaston III (pronounced [gastu] in Occitan) was born on 30 April 1331, (Note: There is no record that gives the exact date of birth of Gaston III of Foix. The date can be deduced thanks to an act of curatorship established on 14 June 1345, indicating that the young Gaston III reached his legal majority (14 years old) on 30 April 1345.) most likely at Orthez in the Château Moncade. (Note: Like his date of birth, no register indicates Gaston's birthplace. However, the Château Moncade was the primary residence of the family and a family tradition gives sons born in Béarn the first name of Gaston.) Gaston's childhood was not well documented, although he did describe himself as an "ungrateful child, an adolescent tormented by the desire for the flesh, and not very good at weapons", in his Livre des oraisons. Gaston III was the sole legitimate heir of Gaston II, though he had several illegitimate half-siblings. He had two half-sisters, Béarnèse (who married Raymond Bernard II of Castelnau-Tursan) and Marguerite (who married John of Châteauverdun, Lord of Caumont), and two half-brothers, Arnaud-Guilhem (who married Jeanne, heiress of the Lordship of Morlanne) and Pierre (who married Florencia of Aragon). The children grew up together, and Gaston III's brothers would remain faithful companions throughout his life. The two illegitimate sons benefited from the same physical and military education as Gaston III, the intellectual and artistic education being reserved solely for Gaston. During her husband's many absences, Aliénor educated Gaston III.

At 9 years old, Gaston III was the subject of an arranged marriage to King James III of Majorca's daughter, Infanta Isabella of Majorca. The death of Gaston II in 1343, as well as the capture of Perpignan by King Peter IV of Aragon, caused the marriage agreement to be abandoned. Gaston II died on 26 September 1343 while fighting in Andalusia for King Alfonso XI of Castile during the Siege of Algeciras. Gaston III was twelve years old when his father died, and due to Gaston II's will, Aliénor served as his tutor and regent until his legal majority at 14 years old. Aliénor continued to manage his property as curator until he was 21 years old. Little is known of Aliénor's death which occurred around 1369, near Le Mas-d'Azil in the County of Foix.

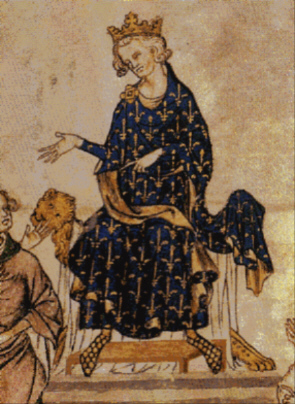
King Philip VI of France from Notes du procès de Robert d'Artois, BnF, Fr.18437, f° 2.

The homage tour that Aliénor organized for Gaston III aimed to introduce the new prince to the various territories belonging to the House of Foix-Béarn, allowing him to familiarize himself with the land and people he would rule. In December 1343, the tour began in Béarn, where Gaston remained until April 1344; in total, Gaston visited 126 places within his domain. The tour lasted more than a year, until January 1345. While serving as regent, Aliénor and Queen Joan II of Navarre negotiated an arranged marriage with one of the queen's daughters, Infanta Agnes of Navarre. Joan II was the only legitimate child of King Louis X of France to survive infancy but was excluded from the French throne in favor of her uncle, Philip V of France. The marriage was postponed until 1349 due to Agnes' age.

==== Legal majority ====
After reaching his legal majority on 30 April 1345, Gaston assumed complete control of the domain. The beginning of his reign is marked, from June 1345, by the resumption of the Hundred Years' War after the five-year-long truce ended. The House of Foix-Béarn's was jointly dependent on both France and England, Gaston III initially sought to continue his father's pro-French policy, although in practice he was restrained in his support of either side. After the Battle of Crécy – which was a crushing defeat for the French – Gaston began to reevaluate his support for Philip VI. When Gaston failed to respond to Philip's summons on 3 June 1347, a representative of Philip VI met with Gaston III at Orthez on 25 September 1347. During this meeting, Gaston confirmed his allegiance to the king for his territories in Foix, he asserted the neutrality of Béarn, a land he held "from God and from no man in the world". (Note: The decision to assert the sovereignty of Béarn owes in part to two of his closest advisers, Bernard of Béarn and Pierre d'Estiron.)

Philip VI did not take offense at the declaration of independence of Béarn and continued his rapprochement with Gaston III, for fear of seeing him switch definitively to supporting the English. On 26 December 1348 at Pamiers, Gaston III paid homage to the king of France for his lands in the seneschalsies of Agen, Toulouse, and Carcassonne, but not Béarn. The Black Death led to repeated renewals of the 1347 to 1355 Truce of Calais, giving Gaston III, age 18, the opportunity to arrange his marriage. During a stay in Île-de-France, Aliénor and Fébus were invited by Joan II to celebrate the wedding. The marriage contract was signed on 5 May 1349, with a promised dowry of 20,000 livres from the Queen of Navarre, with an initial payment of 1,000 livres. The wedding was celebrated on 4 August 1349 in the Temple Church in Paris with the acquiescence of the French king. Through his marriage, Gaston became brother-in-law to both the King of Navarre and the King of France. (Note: Joan II died in October 1349, leaving the Navarrese throne to Agnes' brother, King Charles II of Navarre. In December 1349, the Queen of France, Joan of Burgundy, also died, and her widower, King Philip VI of France, remarried Blanche de Navarre, Agnes' sister.)

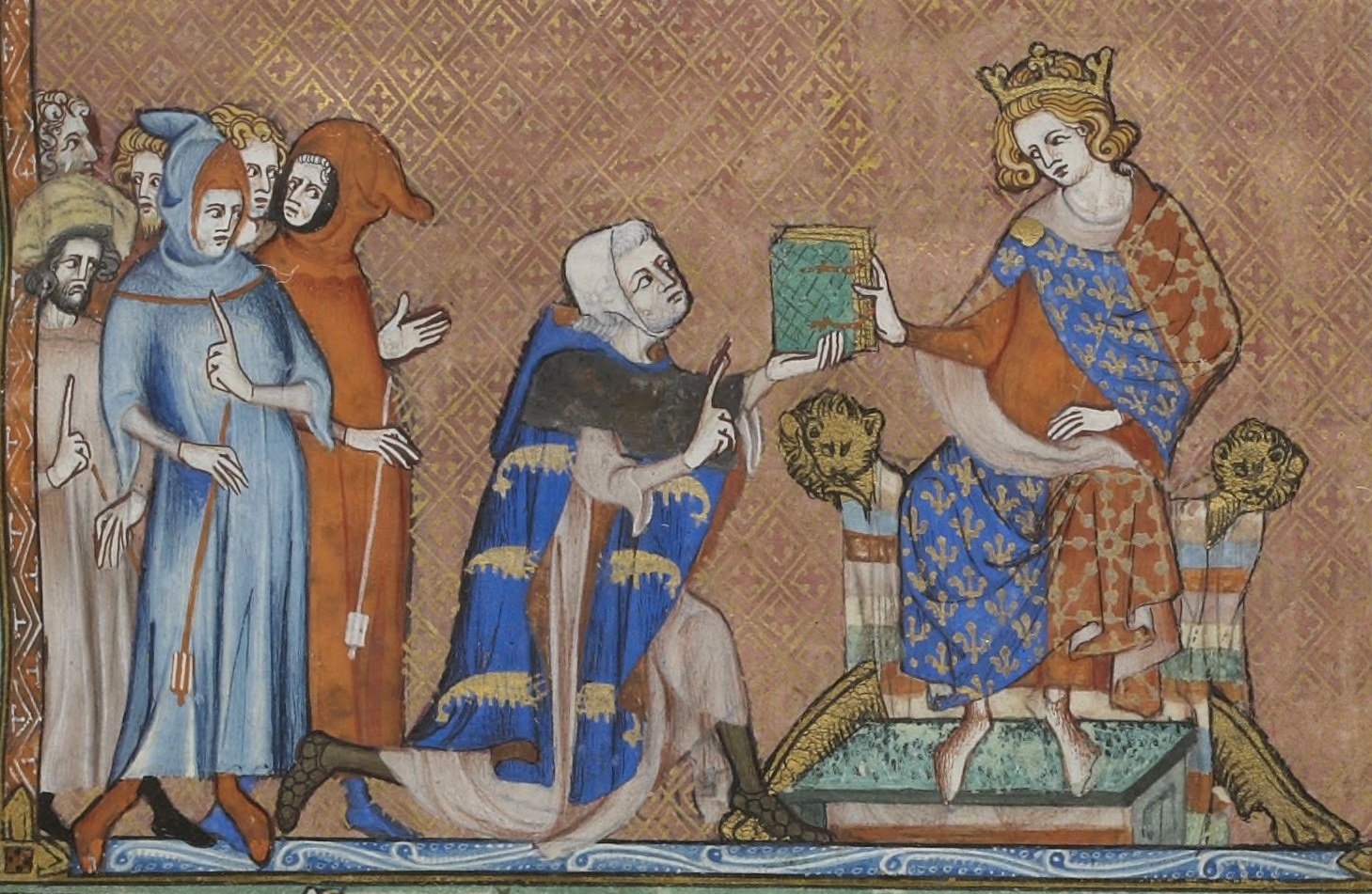
Agnes of Navarre was a granddaughter of King Louis X of France. Miniature dedication of a Vie de saint Louis, BNF, Fr.13568, f° 1.

=== Early reign ===
==== Conflicts with John II ====
Philip VI of France died on 22 August 1350 and was succeeded by his son John II. Anglo-French hostilities resumed in April 1351, once again destabilizing the region north of the Pyrenees. In October 1352, the capitouls asked Gaston III to protect Toulouse against the English troops posted at the gates of Lafrançaise. Gaston, recognizing that it would allow him to maintain his neutrality, demonstrate his power, and fill his coffers with the profits of war, accepted. During Gaston's absence, Béarn was governed by his half-brother, Arnaud-Guilhem, who he had appointed as lieutenant general.

Following the orders of his father, King Edward III of England, (Note: who wanted him to enforce English policy in France) Edward the Black Prince landed in Bordeaux in 1355. Upon arrival, the Black Prince led a grande chevauchée through Armagnac and Toulouse. Gaston did not oppose the Black Prince's army, buying him off with food and supplies. These actions, along with Gaston's refusal to pay homage for Béarn and his involvement in the intrigues of Charles II of Navarre against the throne, led John II to imprison the count (Note: It is likely that Gaston III remained locked up between March and July 1356.) for several months at Petit Châtelet. Faced with the imminent threat of a new chevauchée by the Black Prince from Bordeaux to Calais, and unwilling to see him defect, John released Gaston without exacting an oath of homage for Béarn.

==== On Crusade ====
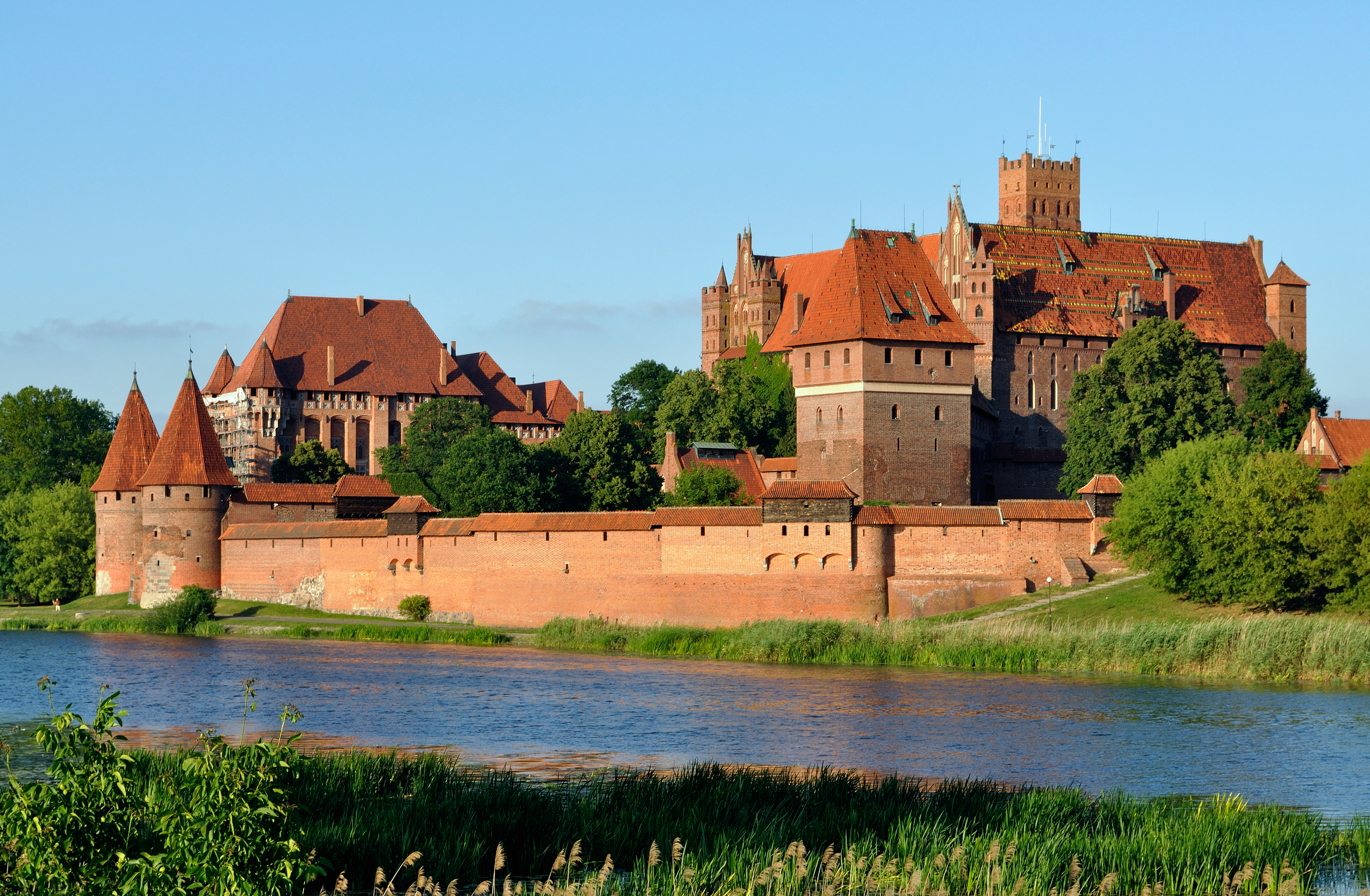
Malbork Castle, where Gaston III was made a knight of the Teutonic Order in 1358.

On 19 September 1356, the French were defeated at the Battle of Poitiers, which resulted in the imprisonment of John II and another truce between the French and the English. This more stable period allowed Gaston to engage in a crusade in Prussia. Alongside the State of the Teutonic Order, he embarked in Bruges, made stops in Norway and Sweden, and arrived in Königsberg on 9 February 1358. The crusaders carried out several assaults before being knighted at Malbork Castle. It was during this crusade that Gaston began using the name Fébus, his battle cry Fébus aban, (Note: Fébus, en avant (Fébus, forward).) and his motto Toquey si gauses. (Note: Touches-y si tu oses (Touch it if you dare).) When the Crusaders returned on horseback in the spring of 1358, France was embroiled in the peasant revolt known as the Jacquerie. Gaston and his companions made use of their martial experience and aided the Dauphine of France, Joanna of Bourbon, and her infant daughter during the siege of Meaux.

From this point on, Gaston III would refer to himself as Fébus while only using Gaston in official capacities before phasing it out completely later in life. He adopted the name Fébus, using the traditional Occitan spelling, in reference to the sun-god Phoebus. The name "Gaston Phoebus" is a posthumous creation by historians of Fébus and would not have been a name that he would have used during his life. Fébus, Gaston, and Gaston III can be used interchangeably. (Note: For clarity, he will be called by Fébus from this point onward.) Shortly after Fébus returned in 1359, and after 10 years of marriage, Agnes gave birth to Fébus' first legitimate son. (Note: There may have been previous pregnancies, but either none were carried to term or they were stillbirths.) The child died almost immediately.

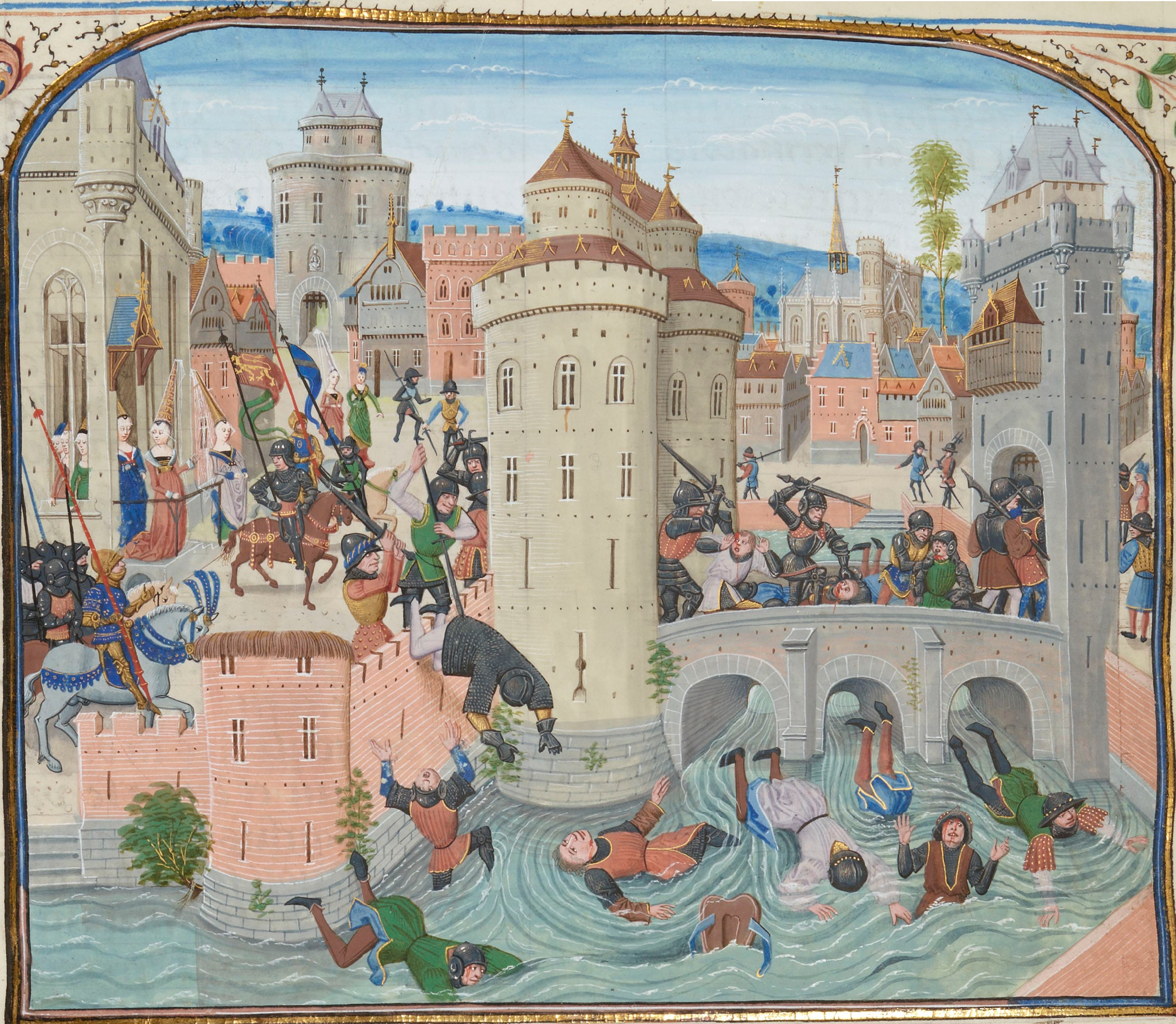
The Jacquerie of Meaux, miniature by Loyset Liédet, taken from the Froissart's Chronicles, BnF, Fr.2643, f°226 v°.

=== The Prince of the Pyrenees ===
==== Rivalry and the birth of an heir ====
After returning home, Fébus was informed of the negotiations between the French and English kings, who aimed to sign a peace treaty. Holding John II in captivity, the English were in a position of strength and demanded a ransom and territorial concessions from the French. The Dauphin, the future Charles V of France, opposed such unequal terms and sought to expand his influence in the South by marrying his brother, John, Duke of Berry, to a daughter of John I, Count of Armagnac. However, by allying himself with the House of Armagnac, the rivalry between the Houses of Foix-Béarn and Armagnac was rekindled. Fébus immediately launched a series of attacks in March 1359, all while offering assurances to the Dauphin of his loyalty. Ultimately, the signing of the Treaty of Brétigny on 8 May 1360 caused John of Berry to be sent to London as insurance against John II's ransom and compensated Fébus for the loss of Bigorre with a cash payout of 200,000 guilders.

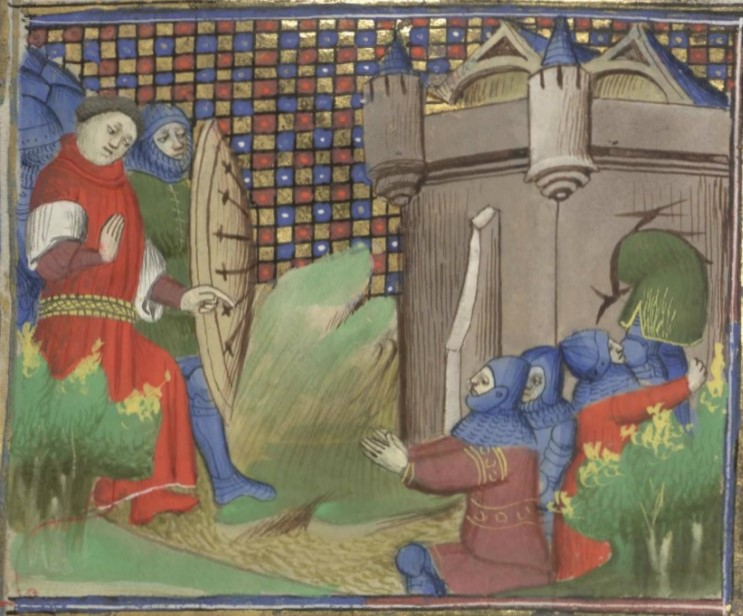
The War of Comminges in 1376. Miniature by the Master of Boèce, taken from the Chronicles of Froissart, Bibliothèque municipale de Besançon, Ms. 865, f° 207 v°.

However, the Treaty of Brétigny failed to resolve the rivalry between the two families. The two families brought together their allies: the House of Albret allied with the Armagnac, while the Viscount of Couserans and the Count of Astarac sided with Fébus. On 5 December 1362, the Battle of Launac took place. Although outnumbered, Fébus emerged victorious and captured much of the southern nobility, including Armagnac. The ransom of 500,000 florins that Fébus extracted from his captives laid the foundations of his financial hegemony over the whole of Southern France. In September 1362, Agnes gave birth to a male heir, Gaston. Despite this, Fébus repudiated Agnes because her brother Charles II of Navarre had failed to pay her remaining dowry. Fébus sent her to Pamplona without her belongings, and the two never met again. The life of Agnes is poorly documented, (Note: Her only known speech came after the death of Fébus in 1391. Agnes testified at the request of her nephew, King Charles III of Navarre, in order to justify compensation from Foix-Béarn to Navarre after her repudiation.) but her marriage to Fébus was likely an unhappy one. Fébus' repudiation of Agnes created an enemy out of the King of Navarre. (Note: Who was also the godfather of the child.)

==== The sovereignty of Béarn ====
The Black Prince arrived in Bordeaux on 29 June 1363 to administer the new Principality of Aquitaine and take possession of the territories ceded to the English by the Treaty of Brétigny. Béarn sovereignty was quickly brought to the fore for Fébus, who remained firm in his stance, while delaying the Black Prince. Fébus formally used this tactic for the first time in March 1363 against an English emissary; (Note: He replied to Seneschal Adam de Houghton that he could not swear an oath to a mere representative of the English King.) he avoided the Black Prince's tribute tour throughout 1363 but finally went to Agen on 14 January 1364 to meet the prince.

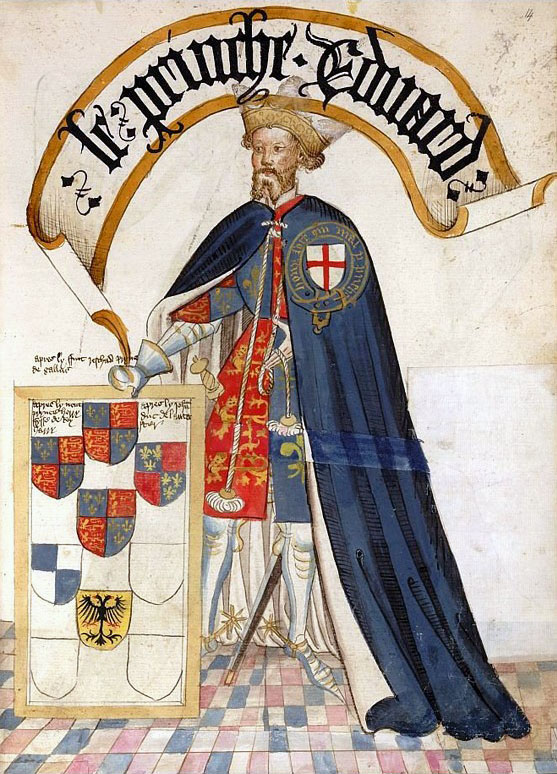
The Black Prince. Miniature from Bruges Garter Book, circa 1445, BL, Stowe 594.

Fébus paid homage for all of his lands "inside the Principality of Aquitaine" in front of the Black Prince. Chandos Herald, a servant of King Edward III, then asked Fébus if he had just paid homage for the land of Béarn, to which Fébus replied that his homage only concerned Marsan and Gabardan. Fébus specified that he would pay homage for Béarn if proof of past homage was provided by a study of the archives. Although initially inclined to have him arrested, the Black Prince allowed Fébus to leave while his archivists searched for evidence of past homage. The English archivists subsequently found traces of a homage made by Margaret of Béarn in 1290 for Béarn, which was enough to convince the Black Prince of his right to claim tribute from Fébus. Fébus continued his evasive tactics throughout 1364 and 1365, seeking to wear down the Black Prince. Eventually, the Black Prince was forced to request the intervention of the new King Charles V of France (Note: After the death of his father John II in April 1364.) by letter on 6 December 1365, informing the king that he would use force if necessary. The letter sparked a resumption of French-English hostilities, this time in Castile.

Fébus once again took advantage of the hostilities. Charles V wished to replace the English-backed King Peter with his own candidate, Henry of Trastámara, Peter's illegitimate half-brother. Fébus, like Charles, supported Henry of Trastámara, to whom he entrusted his illegitimate son, Bernard of Béarn. Henry of Trastámara seized the throne in 1366. The partisans of King Peter mounted a counteroffensive in the winter of 1366, with the Black Prince, the Albrets, the Armagnacs, and Peter himself all taking part. The expedition of the Black Prince began with success on 3 April 1367 at the Battle of Nájera, but Peter of Castile's conduct caused infighting among his supporters (Note: He had many of the prisoners of the battle executed, squandering any chance of obtaining ransoms. He also did not pay the Gascon troops that he hired enough, causing many desertions.) while disease would decimate the remaining army. (Note: Only one in five soldiers survived.) The Black Prince became infected by the disease and returned from the ruined expedition "all broken". Since 8 May 1366, Fébus had been preparing Béarn for a general mobilization pending the return of the expedition; he published an ordinance to the same effect on 27 July 1367. The routed army finally crossed Béarn in the summer of 1367, with the Black Prince seeking prior authorization from Fébus and agreeing to pay for his supplies up to "the least hen". This episode amounted, for the Black Prince, to a de facto recognition of Béarn's full sovereignty.

==== Union of Béarn and Foix ====
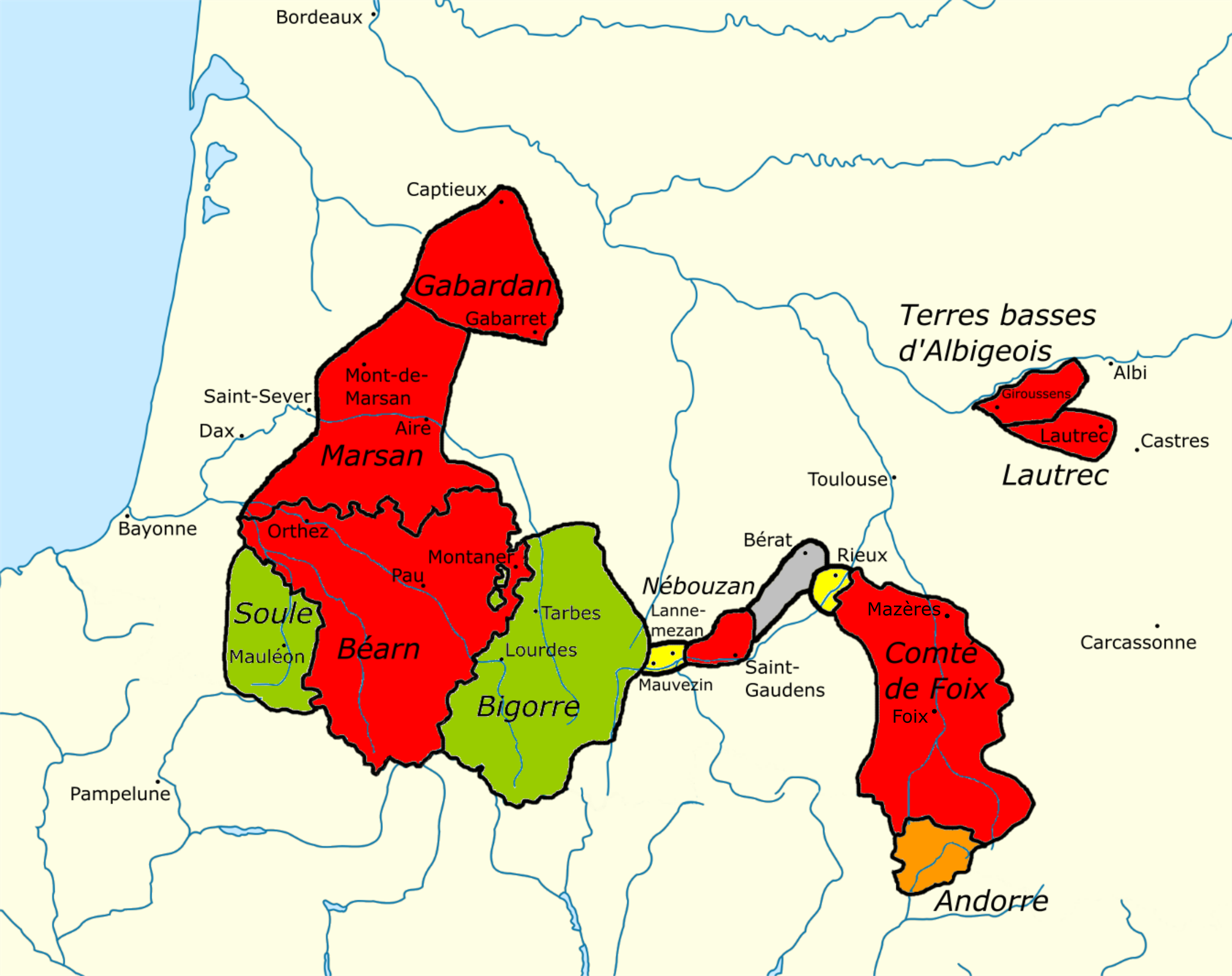
The connection of the Foix-Béarn territories along the Pyrenees.

Freed from the threat of the Black Prince, Fébus turned to face a resurgent France under the leadership of Charles V. Louis I of Anjou, Charles V's brother and lieutenant-general of Toulouse, maneuvered with the House of Armagnac to revive hostilities against the English. Charles V eventually annulled the Treaty of Brétigny, arguing that a (largely perfunctory) clause had not been respected. (Note: The Treaty of Brétigny had stated that the two kings would have the signed treaties confirmed in Bruges, solemnly.) In January 1369, the Armagnacs and the Albrets lodged a formal complaint against the Black Prince in the Parlement of Paris, allowing Charles V to resume military operations in the South.

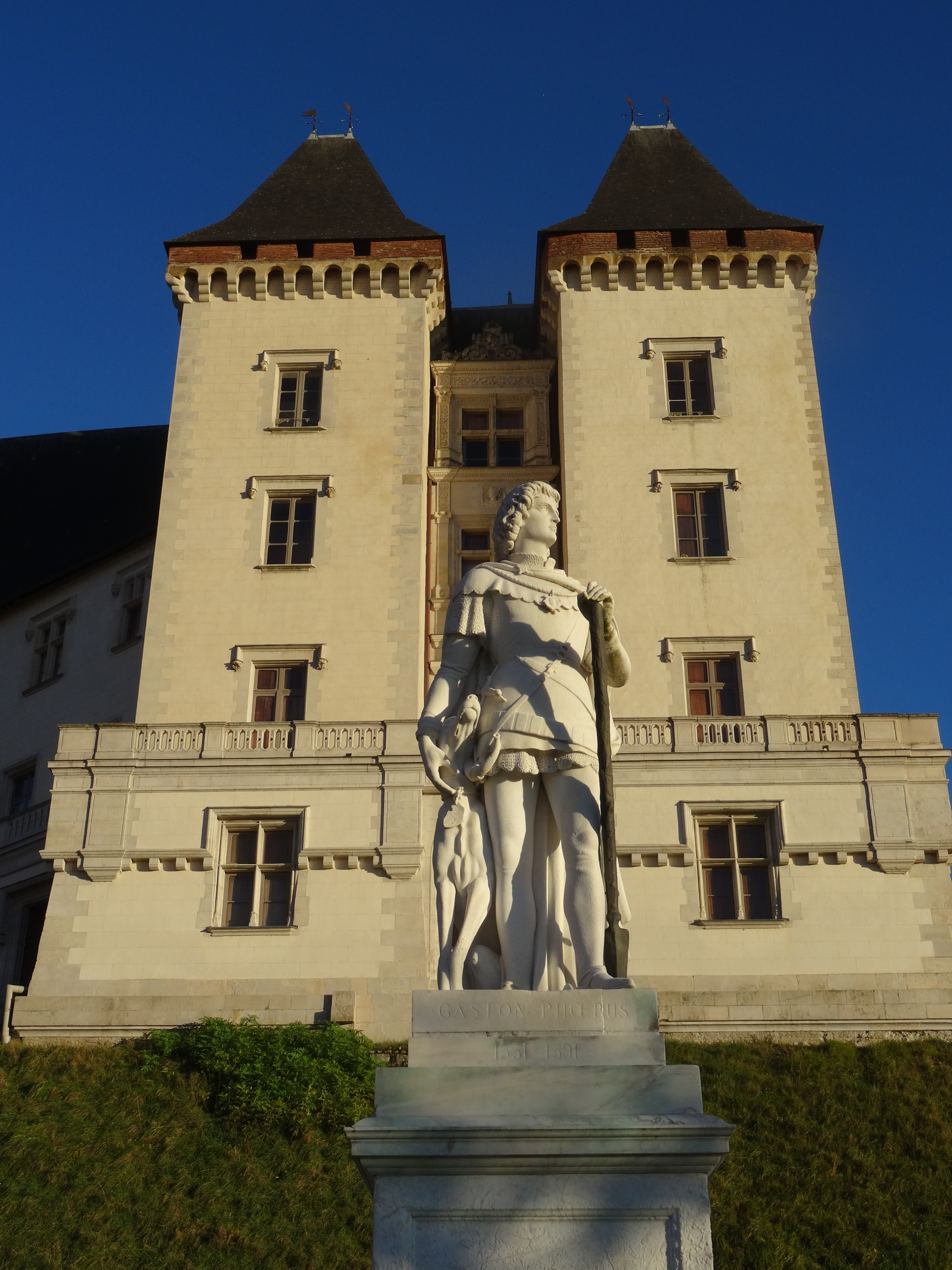
The statue of Fébus in front of the Château de Pau.

Fébus, when faced with the intransigence of the French in favoring the Armagnacs, took advantage of his neutrality to provoke an upheaval of the alliance in favor of the English. He met John of Gaunt, brother of the Black Prince, on 19 and 20 March 1374 in Dax to form an alliance. The agreement first related to the loan of 12,000 florins from Fébus to John of Gaunt in exchange for the Château de Lourdes as a mortgage pledge. Fébus also proposed a marriage between his son Gaston and Philippa, daughter of John of Gaunt. John of Gaunt's actions brought about numerous military operations in the Adour region, leading the Soule citizens to request protection from Fébus, (Note: A Béarnaise garrison was installed in the Château de Mauléon, in exchange for a lump sum payment of 4,000 francs.) a pact that concluded on 4 September 1375. The alliance between Fébus and John of Gaunt was, above all, a political maneuver; the Béarnaise lords never sought to help the English war effort. Faced with John of Gaunt's military actions, Charles V withdrew the lieutenancy-general of Languedoc from John II of Armagnac to once again promote Louis of Anjou, allowing Fébus, again, to go to battle with the Armagnacs. The death of Pierre-Raymond II, Count of Comminges, on 15 October 1375, presented Fébus with the opportunity to claim the inheritance for himself, through his mother Aliénor of Comminges, while the Armagnacs and Albrets backed Pierre-Raymond's infant daughter. This opposition provoked the War of Comminges, with the decisive confrontation at Cazères-sur-l'Adour in November 1376. Fébus carried out a victorious counteroffensive there, once again capturing John II of Armagnac. It was at this battle that Fébus' sons were present; Gaston was provided with two horses, Bernard was granted fourteen, and Yvain was a personal guard for Fébus. This validated that Fébus did not like Gaston, preferring his bastard sons.

Louis of Anjou remained neutral during the conflict and organized the mediation between the two houses after the final battle. He chose Tarbes for the negotiation, with the signing of three documents between 1376 and 1377. Louis of Anjou first recognized Fébus as "Count of Foix and Lord of Béarn" in the name of Charles V. The text also gave the title of dominus Bearni for Fébus, and not vicecomes Bearni, a way of implicitly recognizing the full sovereignty of Béarn. Fébus also received an indemnity of 100,000 francs. On 3 February 1377, a peace treaty was signed, in which it was agreed that Gaston, son and heir to Fébus, and Beatrice, daughter of the Count of Armagnac, would marry. After numerous negotiations, a final agreement was signed on 3 April 1379 in Barcelonne-du-Gers, on the border between Marsan and Armagnac. The marriage between Gaston and Beatrice was celebrated on 19 April 1379 at Manciet, and in the absence of Fébus, under particularly modest conditions for a prince of his rank. The agreement signed with Louis of Anjou and the Armagnacs allowed Fébus to achieve the unification of Béarn and Foix. The hereditary acquisition of the castellanies of Mauvezin and Goudon made it possible to expand Nébouzan to the west, joining this territory to Bigorre. To the east of Nébouzan, Fébus could now rely on a dozen lords dependent on Comminges (Note: While Fébus renounced his claims to Comminges in the agreement with Louis of Anjou, the treaty nevertheless granted him the following of a dozen lords from Comminges during his lifetime. These lords had sided with Fébus during the War of Comminges, so they remained on his side following the peace. The agreement was only valid for Fébus and would not continue for his descendants.) and allowed continuity with the county of Foix. With the complicity of the Compagnons de Lourdes, (Note: The Compagnons led attacks on Bigorrian villages, prompting them to seek help from Fébus.) Fébus urged Bigorrian municipalities to seek his protection. During the summer of 1379, 26 conventions were signed between Fébus and Bigorrian communities, and Tarbes was the last to cede on 27 November 1379.

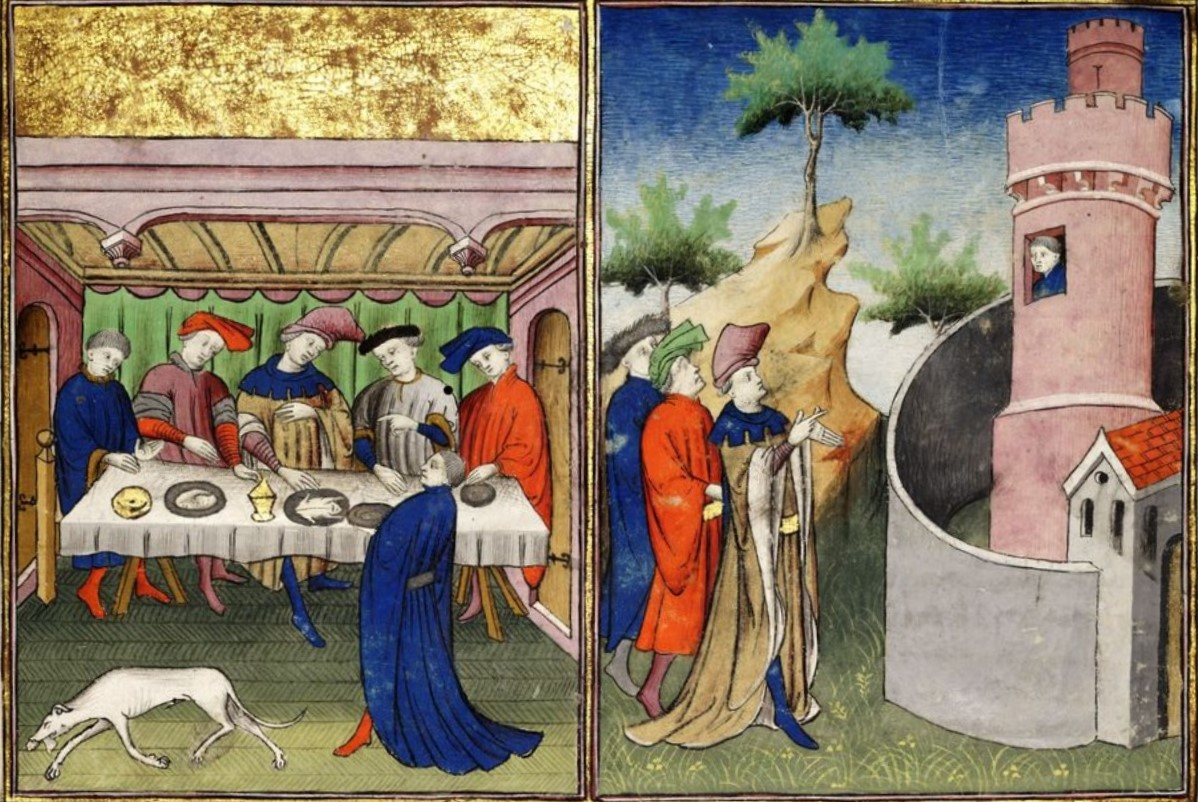
The Drama of Orthez according to Chronicles of Froissart, Brussels, KBR, ms. II 88, fil. 16, circa 1410.

=== End of rule and succession ===
==== Plot and the Drama of Orthez ====
Fébus became more imperious as he grew older. The clergy did not appreciate the paucity of religious foundations during Fébus' reign and resented his position vis-à-vis the papacy during the Western Schism. Part of the Béarnaise nobility, notably the Baron d'Andoins, also turned away from Fébus, feeling that they were being pushed aside from power in favor of "technocrats" of humble origins. Additionally, Fébus' repudiation of Agnes in 1362 created an enemy out of Charles II of Navarre, her brother. The alliance of these discontents led to the formation of a plot against Fébus, first dating to the summer of 1378.

Gaston, Fébus' only legitimate son and heir, also took part in the plot. Gaston grew up without knowing his mother, though he maintained links to her family by visiting the court of Navarre several times on his father's authorization. (Note: Gaston's visit to Navarre is, for example, reported in the spring of 1375, probably to attend the wedding of Prince Charles III and Infanta Eleanor of Castile.) During one of these trips to the Court of Navarre while in the company of Charles II of Navarre, Gaston would scheme against Fébus. He was greatly dissatisfied with his condition: playing no role in politics, serving only as a pawn for his father, and having a lifestyle deemed too modest for his rank. Aged 18, he was tasked by his uncle, the King of Navarre, with administering a poison to his father. Between late July and early August 1380, the plot was discovered before coming to fruition, and Gaston was imprisoned in the Château Moncade in Orthez. Meanwhile, Odon de Mendousse and the Baron d'Andoins were exiled to the court of Charles II. The sequence of events is uncertain; Fébus destroyed all the documents relating to the Drama of Orthez. Only the testimonies of Froissart and Juvénal des Ursins remain, both of which contain improbabilities.

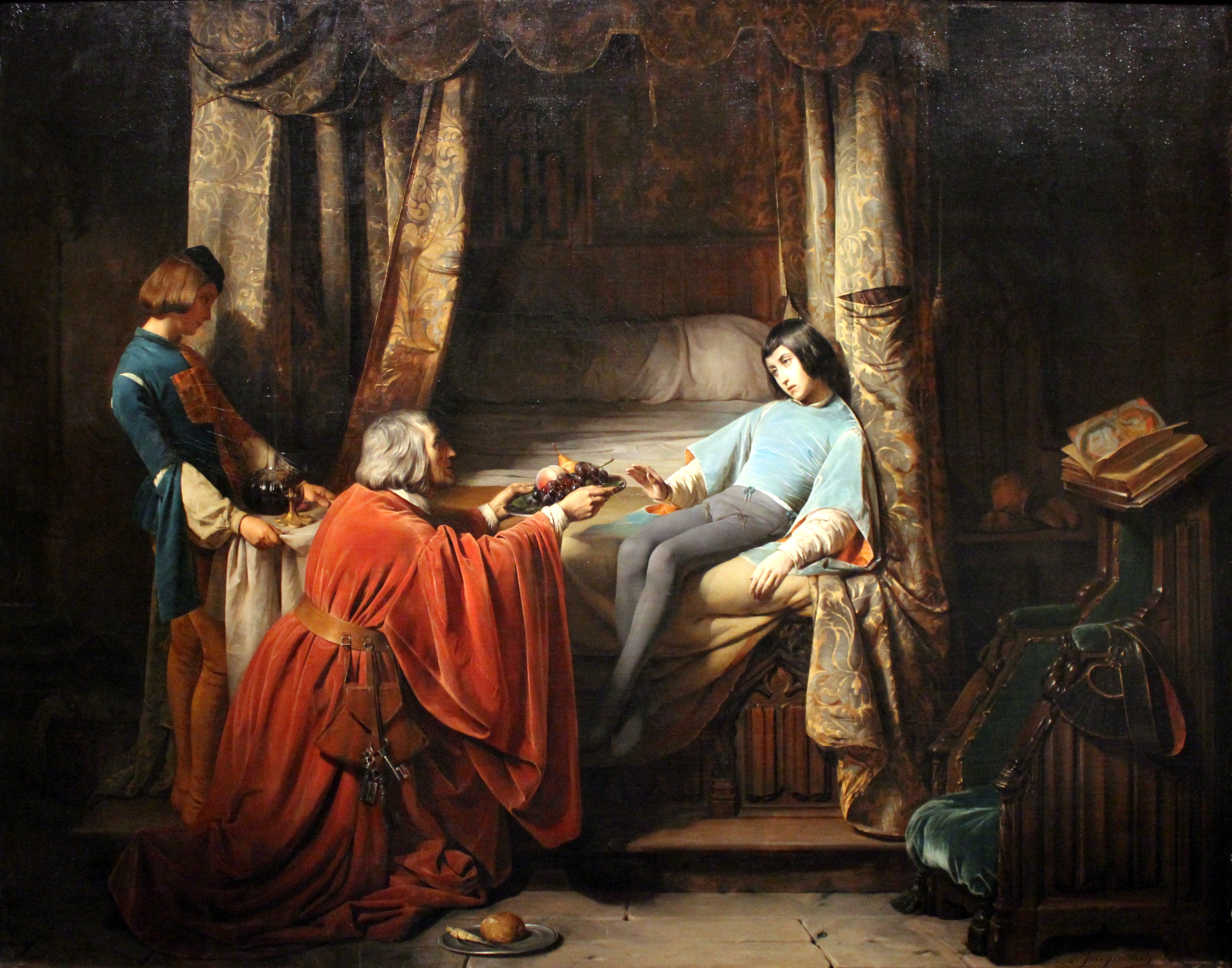
Young Gaston, Known as the Angel of Foix, by Claudius Jacquand, 1838, currently at the Louvre, illustrates the Drama as told by Froissart.

Froissart's account exonerates the young Gaston by placing the burden on Charles II of Navarre. Gaston is supposed to want to give his father a love potion (actually poison) so that Fébus can reconcile with Agnes. According to Froissart, who related the words of an old squire, when Gaston and his half-brother, Yvain de Béarn, were "playing and frolicking in their beds" and

"while Gaston's cotte, containing the powder and purse, was lying on the bed, Ieuwain, (Note: Froissart spells Yvain as both Yewain and Ieuwain.) Gaston's brother, Ieuwain, who was quite mischievous, smelled the powder in the purse and asked Gaston, his brother: 'What is this thing that you carry on your chest every day?'"

When the powder was given to a greyhound, it turned out to be poison. (Note: It is noted by Tucoo-Chala that the account presented by Froissart was implausible, given that Gaston was 18 years old, married, and a lord in his own right.) According to Froissart, Fébus went on to unintentionally kill Gaston by starvation following an argument in the prison in mid-August 1380.

In comparison, Juvénal des Ursins describes a different scene, with Fébus having had his son sentenced to death. However, if the prince had been condemned to death and then executed, the trace of such a case would have been much more important, with documentation of the event surviving. Both versions agree that, following a failed poisoning attempt against his father, Gaston died, probably by the hand of Fébus, in August 1380. Gaston's participation in the plot was likely the result of resentment towards his father over the favoritism of his half-brothers. The tragedy overwhelmed Fébus, who said, "Never will I have joy as perfect as before". He writes his Livre des oraisons, accrediting the thesis of the involuntary crime, and leaves Orthez for Pau, not returning to the Château Moncade until four years later. The death of Gaston deprived Fébus of a legitimate heir.

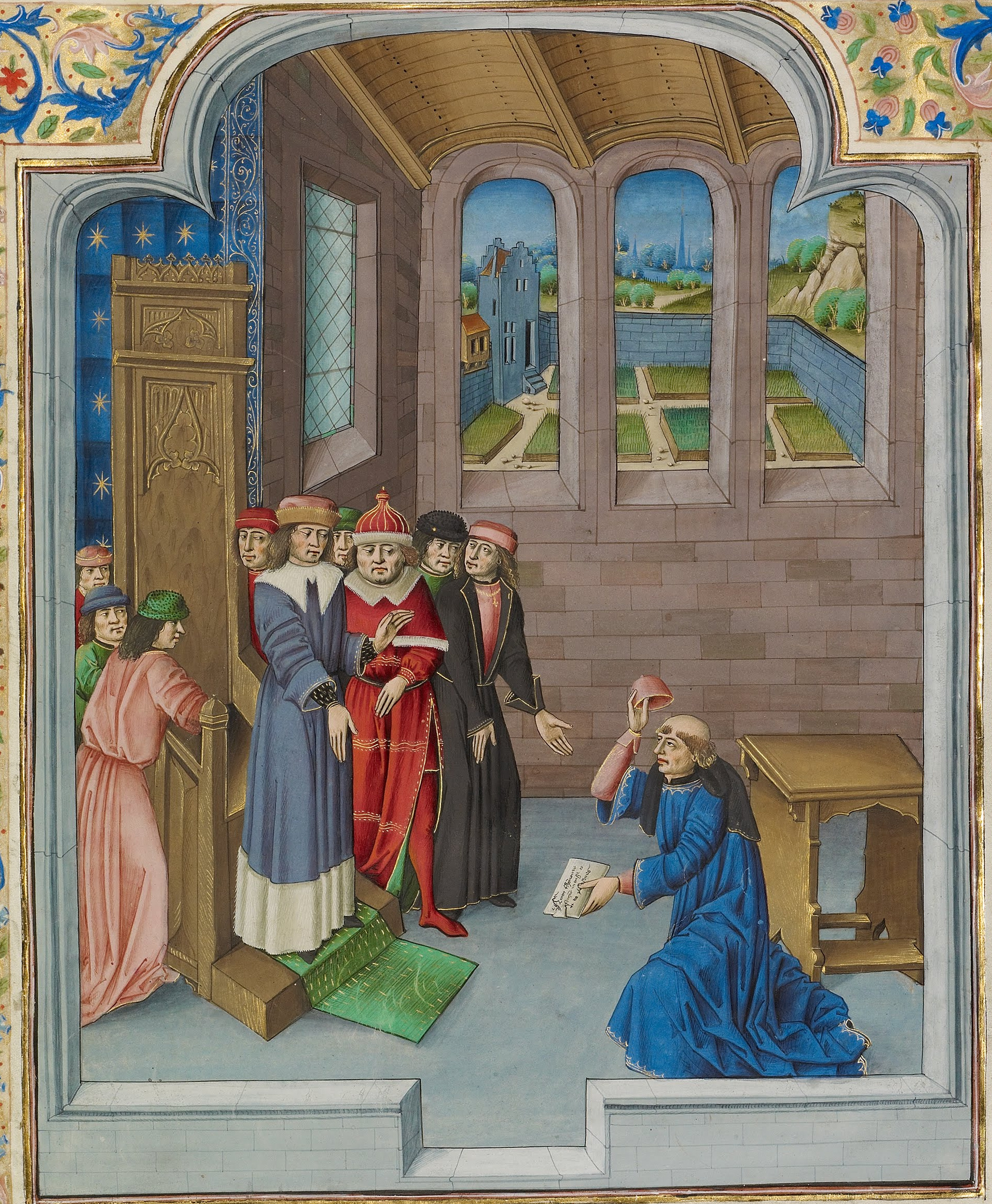
Froissart kneeling before Fébus, Count of Foix

==== Alliance with Charles VI ====
Fébus began his longest stay in the Pays de Foix on 18 January 1381. At the Château de Mazères, he ruled Foix-Béarn until the middle of August 1382. On 18 September 1380, Charles V died and was succeeded by his son Charles VI. A regency composed of the young king's four uncles (Note: The Dukes of Anjou, Burgundy, Berry, and Bourbon.) was formed, with the Duke of Berry serving as lieutenant-general of Languedoc. Fébus' peace agreement with the House of Armagnac had broken down following the Drama of Orthez. Wishing to mark his territory in the event of a possible rapprochement with the Armagnacs, Fébus launched an attack on 21 July 1381 against a company of about 2,500 mercenaries brandishing the standard of the Duke of Berry, successfully routing the company. This success allowed Fébus to open negotiations from a position of strength with the French dukes. The Duke of Berry came to Mazères on 9 September 1381, and negotiations opened on 28 December 1381 at Capestang. In this agreement, Fébus recognized the Duke of Berry's authority in Languedoc in exchange for the Duke's commitment not to support the Armagnacs along with an annual annuity. The agreement freed the Duke of Berry to quash the Tuchin revolt and allowed Fébus to attack the Armagnacs with total impunity. (Note: Fébus notably led attacks against Bigorre in 1379 and the Albrets between July 1381 and August 1382. Faithful bands carried out raids in the Casteljaloux district, causing its citizens to ask for Fébus' protection.) He left the County of Foix on 4 August 1382 to return to Béarn. Fébus returned to Orthez on 5 April 1383, the first time since the Drama of Orthez in 1380, to organize the passage of Louis II, Duke of Bourbon's army in 1385 to take part in the conflict for the throne of Portugal.

In 1388, Charles VI chose to tour the southern territories and sent Louis de Sancerre to discuss topics related Fébus' administration: the succession of Foix-Béarn, (Note: Fébus, who was approaching 60, no longer had any legitimate heirs.) relations with the House of Armagnac, (Note: John III, Count of Armagnac succeeded his father in 1384.) and the status of Bigorre. (Note: Bigorre is theoretically French but was controlled militarily by Fébus.) Following these discussions, a meeting between the Béarnaises and Armagnacs on 26 July 1389 laid the foundations for a peace agreement. A meeting between the king and Fébus was set to take place in Toulouse, though the Count of Foix demanded that this meeting not call into question the sovereign status of Béarn. Louis de Sancerre asked Fébus to clearly choose between the French and English in case hostilities resumed; Fébus then replied, "I hold my country of Béarn from God, from my sword, from my lineage and I have no need to put myself in bondage."

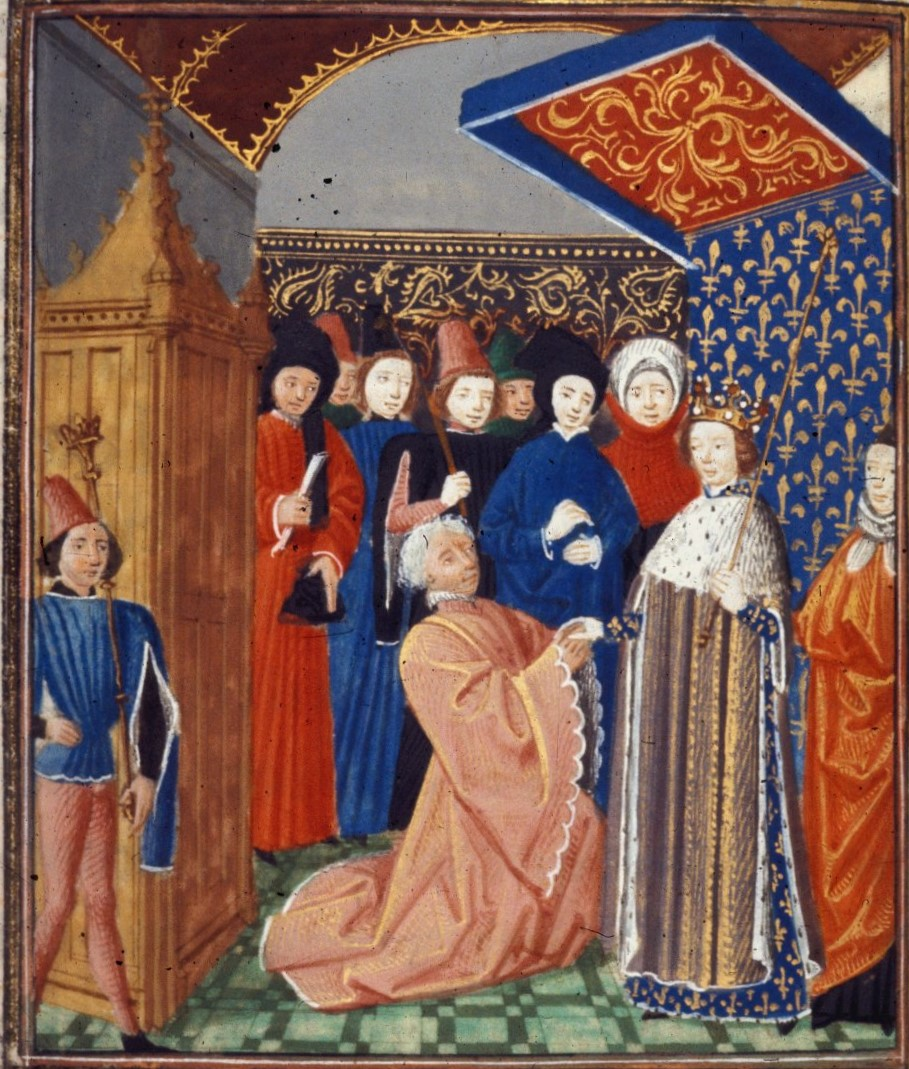
Fébus meets Charles VI in Toulouse in 1390. Miniature attributed to Philippe de Mazerolles, Chronicles of Froissart, London, BL, Harley 4379, f° 29 v°.

Fébus' arrival into Toulouse was noted as a spectacle, his retinue being composed of 200 knights and 200 men-at-arms. He stayed there for two days beginning 4 January 1390. The first meeting between Charles VI and Fébus took place on 5 January 1390 at Château Narbonnais; the Béarnaise lord was treated like a prince. (Note: Fébus pays homage only to the king, not to his brothers; he was seated at the king's head table during the gala dinner.) Afterwards, Fébus organized a sumptuous meal for 200 people to which he invited the Dukes of Touraine and Bourbon. On 5 January 1390, Fébus made Charles VI his universal legatee and received a life annuity for Bigorre along with 100,000 francs, Fébus gave his seal to the treaty, but did not sign it. The treaty was particularly favorable to the French because it incorporated the feudal inheritance of the South into France in exchange for gold payment and the temporary cession of Bigorre. Subsequent commitments he made would contradict those that he agreed to at Toulouse. In two agreements signed on 15 May and 10 June 1390 in Pamiers and Girona, Fébus joined a league against the House of Armagnac (Note: Contrary to the agreement sealed on 10 January 1390 with Charles VI at Mazères.) with King John I of Aragon. The agreements specified that this alliance would also be valid for their heirs.

==== Death and succession ====
Febus died on 1 August 1391 at L'Hôpital-d'Orion, on the road between Sauveterre-de-Béarn and Orthez. After a hunt in the Sauveterre region, Fébus and his retinue dined at L'Hôpital-d'Orion, where he fell victim to a fatal stroke. The story of his death comes from Jean Froissart, who collected the testimony of Espan du Lion, (Note: Espan du Lion accompanied Matthew of Foix-Castelbon to the court of France after the death of Fébus in order to negotiate the cancellation of the Treaty of Toulouse.) who was present that day. Froissart writes,

«[Fébus] got up from the seat and stretched out his hands to wash them. As soon as the cold water ran down his fingers [...], his face turned pale, his heart quivered, his feet gave way under him, he fell on the seat, which upended, saying, "I am dead. Lord, true God, forgive me". He never spoke again.»

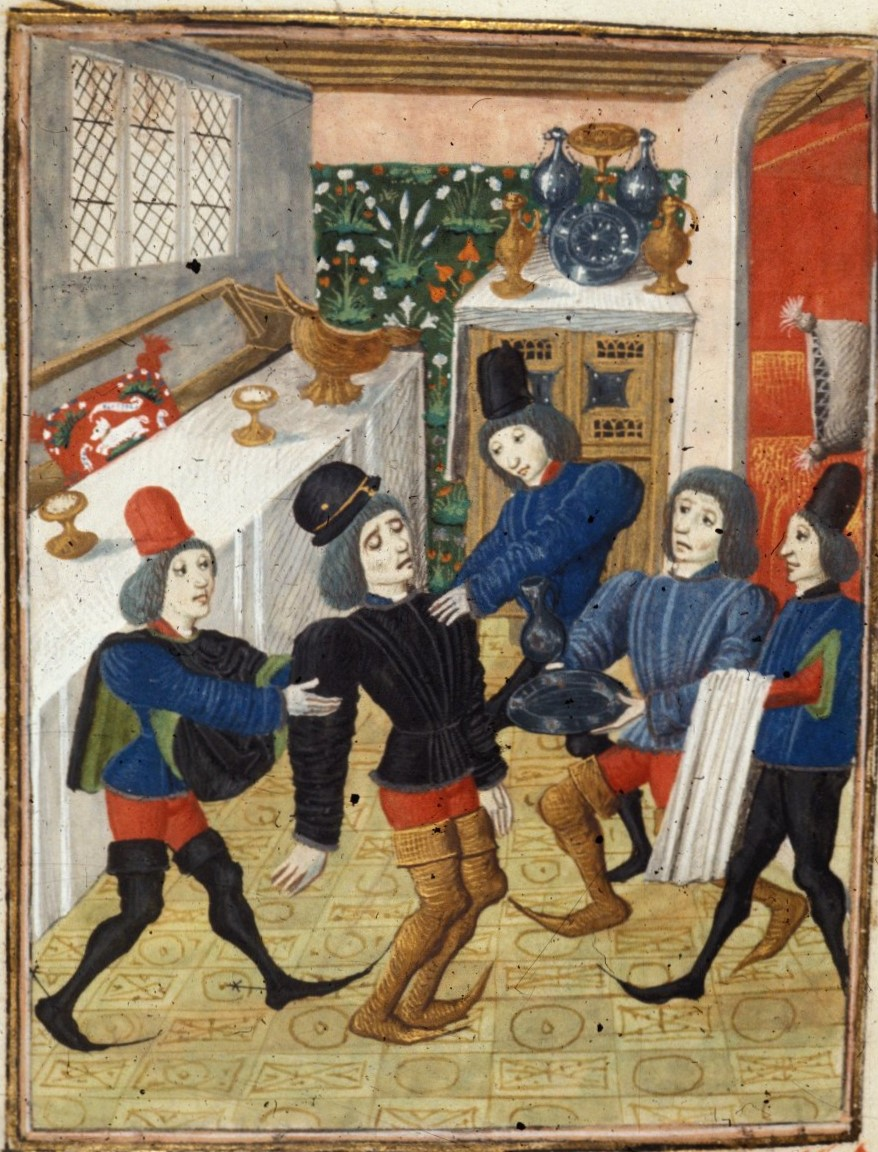
The death of Fébus. Chronicles of Froissart, London, BL, Harley 4379, f° 126.

Jean Froissart's account specified that Fébus went bear hunting that day, which was improbable for the Sauveterre region in August, deer hunting being more likely. (Note: Fébus, in his Livre de Chasse, explained that the bears rarely descend from the mountains, except in the event of a shortage of food, which would not be the case at the beginning of August. Also, the story speaks of the "curée", a medieval hunting term that was used to describe the act of quartering a deer to feed to the hounds after a successful hunt. It is likely that Froissart introduced the bear to reinforce his story, the animal being the emblem of the Béarnaise mountains.) Fébus' illegitimate son, Yvain, was present when his father died and made a brief attempt to succeed him. Yvain and his conspirators at L'Hôpital-d'Orion attempted to seize the treasury of Orthez before the news of Fébus' death spread. The attempt failed, (Note: The news of Fébus' death had time to reach Orthez before Yvain attempted to take possession of the treasury.) and he was forced to let the jurats of Orthez take control. Once Fébus' death became common knowledge, his remains were first transported to the Château de Sauveterre and then to Orthez at the end of the morning of 2 August 1391. Fébus' funeral took place on 2 October 1391, probably in the convent of the Order of Preachers (also called the Jacobins convent). The coffin was buried in the church, without any recumbent statue, mausoleum, or tombstone.

Without a legitimate heir and after Yvain's attempt to seize power, succession became an urgent issue in the Foix-Béarn territory. The succession was of particular import in Béarn, which was anxious to defend its independence. On 8 August 1391, the Estates of Béarn met for the first time in Orthez; this assembly brought together the Cour majour (Note: The Cour majour was an assembly of high-ranking nobles and clerics.) and the Cour des Communautés. (Note: The Cour des Communautés were the delegates of the towns and the countryside.) The treasure of Orthez was inventoried (Note: It contained 737,550 guilders.) and its contents distributed, with a portion going to the illegitimate sons of Fébus. In the absence of a will, the Estates used the will of Gaston II as a precedent and designated Matthew of Foix-Castelbon as the legitimate heir, (Note: Matthew of Foix-Castelbon was the grandson of Roger-Bernard III of Foix-Castelbon, younger brother of Gaston II, and thus the next in the line of succession of Foix-Béarn.) provided that several prerequisites are met, including the maintenance of Béarn's sovereignty. The Estates also demanded a greater role in government, putting an end to Fébus' practice of enlightened despotism. However, the continued sovereignty and neutrality of Béarn was the main priority of the Estates, as they "had nothing to do with the King of France", unlike the County of Foix. The annulment of the Treaty of Toulouse, concluded in 1390, was therefore of primary concern for the Foix-Bearn region. If the treaty remained in place, a legitimate heir would be deprived of succession, while if it was annulled, Béarn would regain its autonomy from Foix. In exchange for 250,000 francs, Charles VI annulled the Treaty of Toulouse and recognized Matthew as Fébus' sole heir by letters patent dated 20 December 1391. The Foix-Béarn lands were preserved, as was the sovereignty of Béarn, though the consolidated authority of Fébus gave way to co-governance between the lord and assemblies of representatives.

== Court life ==
=== An enlightened despotism ===
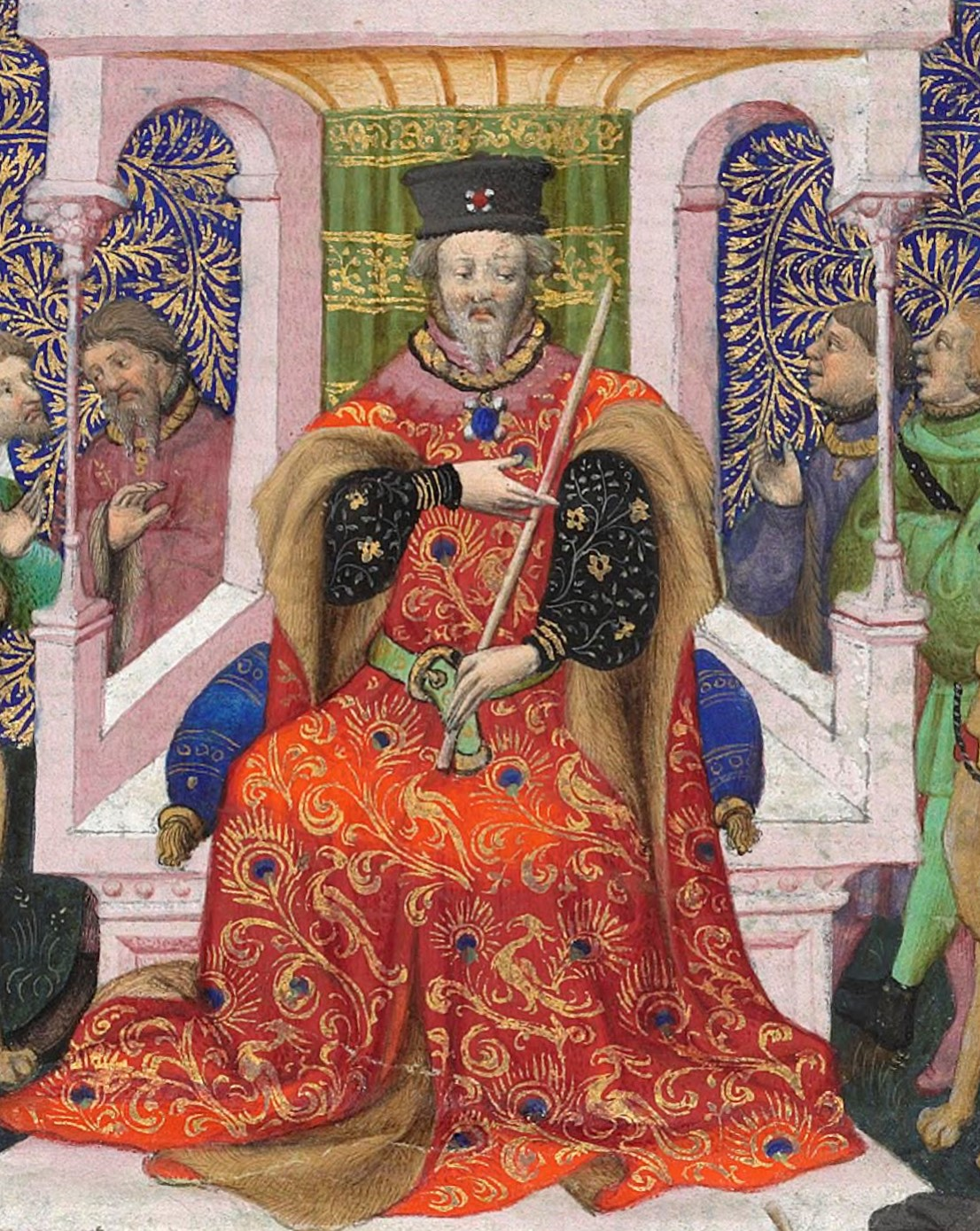
Fébus surrounded by his huntsmen, miniature by the Master of the Adelphes, circa 1407, Livre de chasse, BnF, Fr.616, f° 13 r°.

Fébus ruled as an enlightened despot, especially in Béarn. He dismissed the nobility and the traditional assemblies in favor of a regime that functioned solely under his discretion. Fébus established a private council without permanent membership and appointed lieutenant generals who would rule in his stead while he was traveling. This station was reserved for members of his family, including Arnaud-Guilhem, before the abolition of the role in 1365. Fébus made all major policy decisions and exercised complete control over appointments, favoring family members and lawyers but usually excluding the nobility. (Note: The absence of the Béarnaise nobility in Fébus' inner circle explains why they plotted his death in 1380.)

However, Fébus did not rule Foix as he ruled Béarn. Fébus monopolized the administration of Béarn, notably in judicial matters, where previous viscounts had played a more limited role. The traditional courts of Béarn (Cour Majour and Cour des Communautés), as well as the seneschal, were marginalized in favor of the "audience deu senhor," which was entirely under Fébus' control. Fébus' stranglehold over Foix was just as strong, though less self-focused. Fébus preferred to delegate his authority to the seneschal, as Foix was not his primary residence, though he maintained a firm grip over fiscal and military matters.

As he grew older, Fébus became more and more authoritarian and inflexible. He did not take social classes into account when making legal decisions and would condemn a baron against a simple peasant. Additionally, Fébus usually extracted fines as punishment, only rarely resorting to imprisonment and never execution. Fébus also made himself visible to his subjects. For example, Fébus would hear legal cases in the open air, on the banks of the Gave de Pau, in imitation of Saint Louis, who rendered justice beneath an oak tree.

=== Administration and finance ===
In addition to the income generated from his military victories through ransoms, Fébus developed a system of taxation throughout his territories. In Béarn, Fébus revamped the state administration, particularly with regard to forests and mountains; he also instituted tolls, as on the Le Pont Vieux at Orthez. In Foix, he was particularly interested in industrial income. (Note: Fébus granted the city of Foix a monopoly over the manufacture of iron objects in the county; Fébus also owned four forges.) Fébus had gold florins struck at the Morlaàs workshops to open up Béarn more widely to Aquitaine and Iberian trade. (Note: The workshops of Morlaàs then mainly minted the traditional Morlan coinage, the use of which began to decline outside Béarn.) From 1367, the fouage was levied: it was a flat-rate direct tax of 2 francs that each head of the family paid annually. The fouage is based on the feu fiscal; thus, the Febusian administration needed to conduct a regular census. A few of these surveys survive, in particular one of Béarn in 1385 (Note: The survey of 1385 allows us to learn that Béarn had 407 communities at the time and that the largest of these communities was Orthez with around 2,000 inhabitants, followed closely by Oloron with around 1,600 inhabitants, and finally Morlaàs with 1,300 residents. The Ossau Valley in total has around 3,800 inhabitants.) and Foix, Albigensian, and Lautrécois in 1390. The fogadger was responsible for collecting this tax, which was then centralized with all the other taxes at the Château Moncade.

Fébus was rigorous in collecting Fouage payments, not hesitating to imprison jurats and prosecutors at the slightest delay. In addition to the Fouage, he issued a capital gains tax in 1380 (named creix) and made various arrangements with the Cagots. (Note: On 6 December 1379, Fébus passed a treaty with Cagot carpenters by which they undertook to construct the framework of the Château de Montaner, as well as the necessary fittings with their expenses. In return, the prince granted them the reduction of two francs on the fouage, exemptions from the size, and allowed them to collect wood in the forests. The recognition of the Cagots towards Fébus was manifested in 1383 by a tribute to the sovereign, a tribute in which ninety-eight of them appear. In 1379, serfs were exempted from chores in return for money payments, the proceeds of which were allocated to the work of the Château de Montaner.) Court fines were another source of revenue, and Fébus preferred this sentence to any other because each execution cost him a potential taxpayer. In his chronicles, Froissart was amazed by the willingness of Fébus' subjects to pay taxes and the exceptional peace enjoyed by the territory. The prince also increased his fortune through multiple loans he granted to other lords, which allowed him to expand his political influence. While Fébus was a "virtuoso" at generating income, he was also described as "close to his pennies." Fébus was frugal in his private habits, though he spent lavishly when doing so would win him political influence.

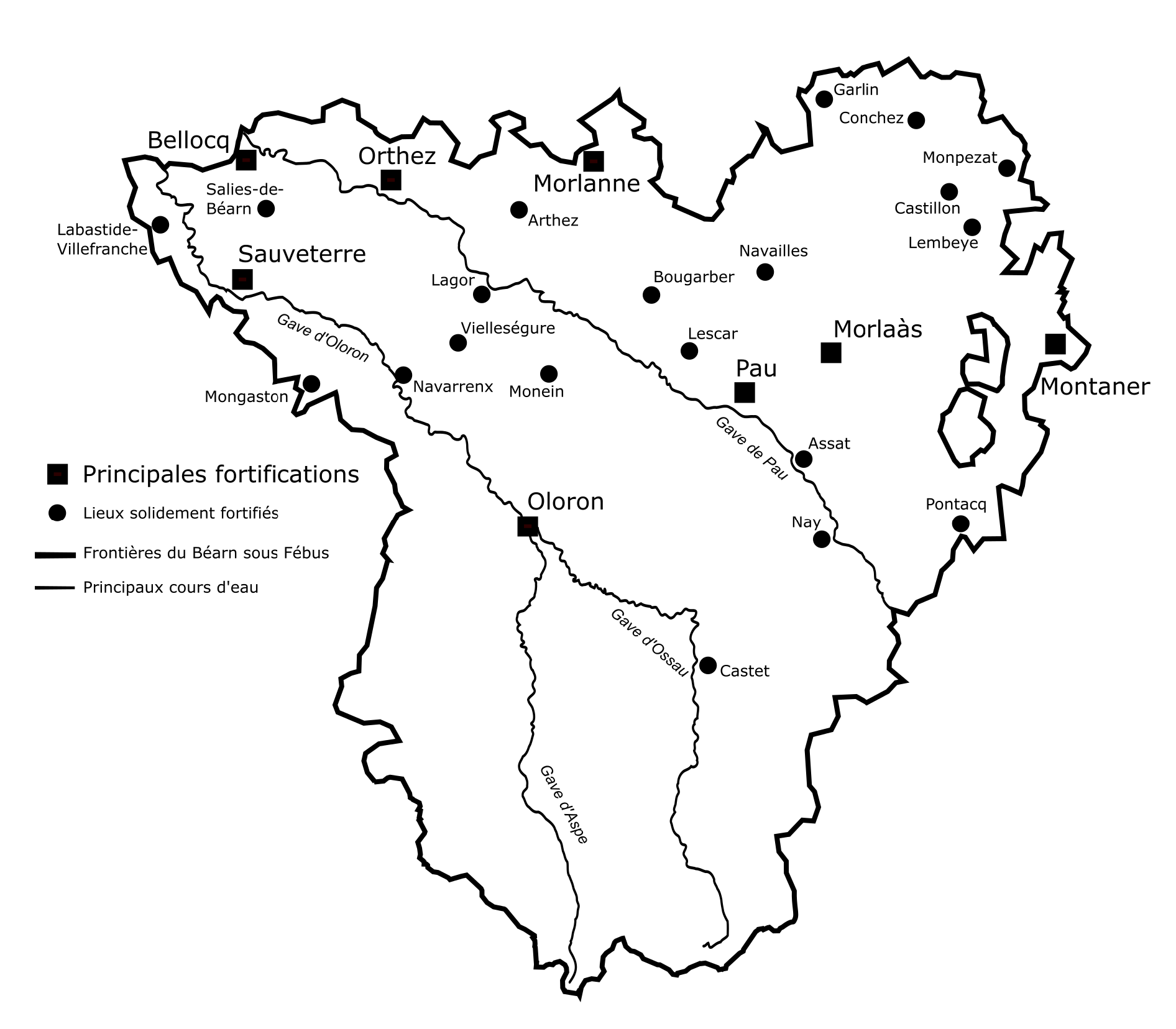
The defensive system of Fébus in Béarn.

=== Military career ===
==== Military strategies ====
Fébus reigned during an era marked by constant conflicts, so it was important for him to have an army that could be quickly mobilized and in numbers. Fébus could muster a force of around 4,000 men and more than 1,000 horses, divided equally between Béarn and Foix. He could also raise a massive levy to defend the interior if required, transforming each able-bodied inhabitant into a soldier. Fébus' army of 4,000 men exceeded what the other princes of the South could raise but did not reach the 7,000 to 10,000 men mobilized by the kings of France and England during the battles of Poitiers or Crécy.

==== Military constructions ====
Fébus built a vast network of fortifications during his reign. At the end of his life, the prince controlled approximately forty fortresses along the Pyrénées, from Soule to Foix. This network was heterogeneous since Fébus had inherited a majority of the constructions. Between 1372 and 1378, his endowment was reorganized and consolidated with the Château de Pau as the center of his defensive system to the east of Béarn. Among the constructions carried out under his supervision, Morlanne and Montaner are the two most complete surviving examples. The use of brick instead of the traditional cut stone is the most characteristic element of Febusian constructions. It was inspired by the Palace of the Kings of Majorca in Perpignan and the Bellver Castle in the Balearic Islands, where its architect, Sicard de Lordat, was trained.

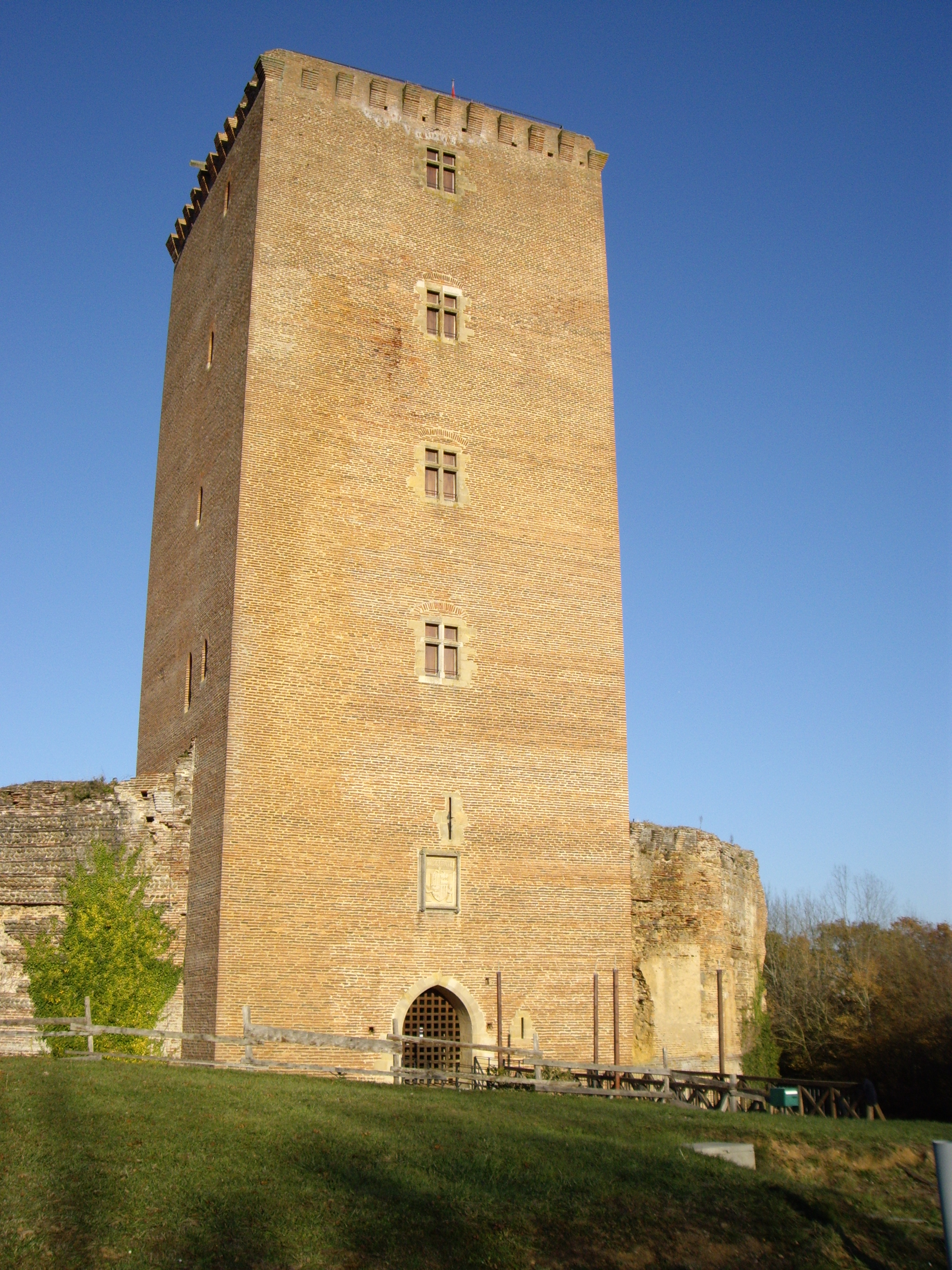
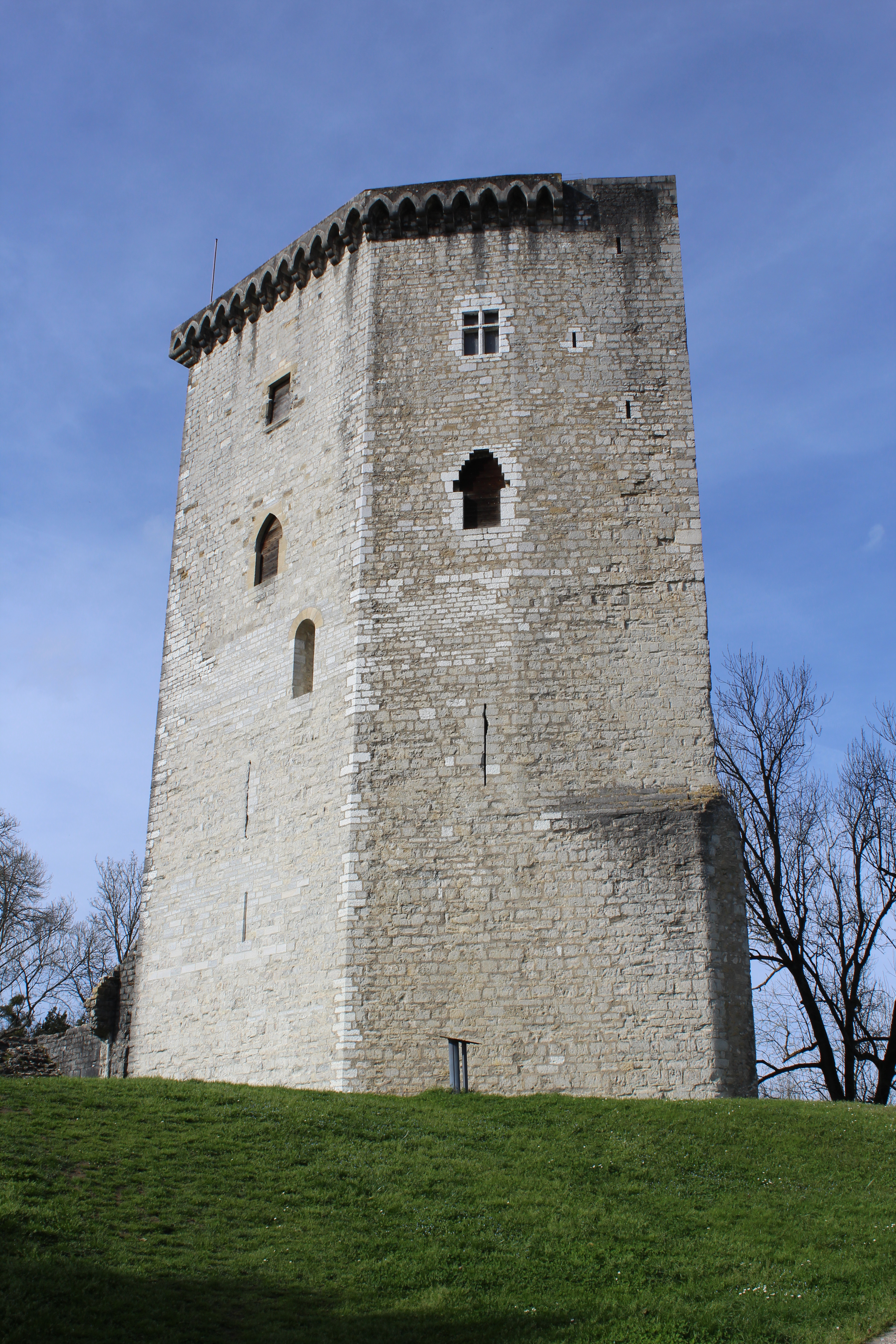
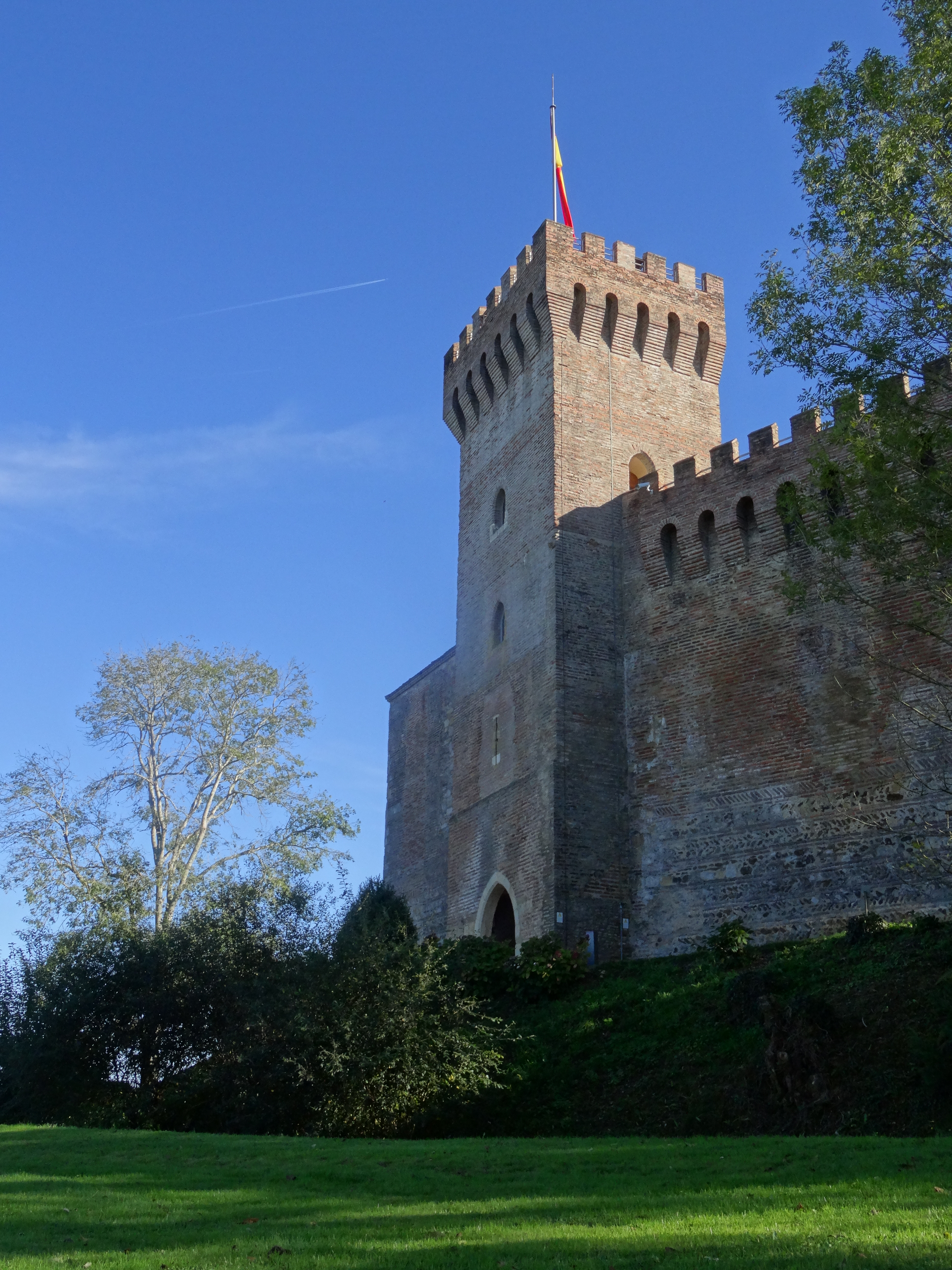
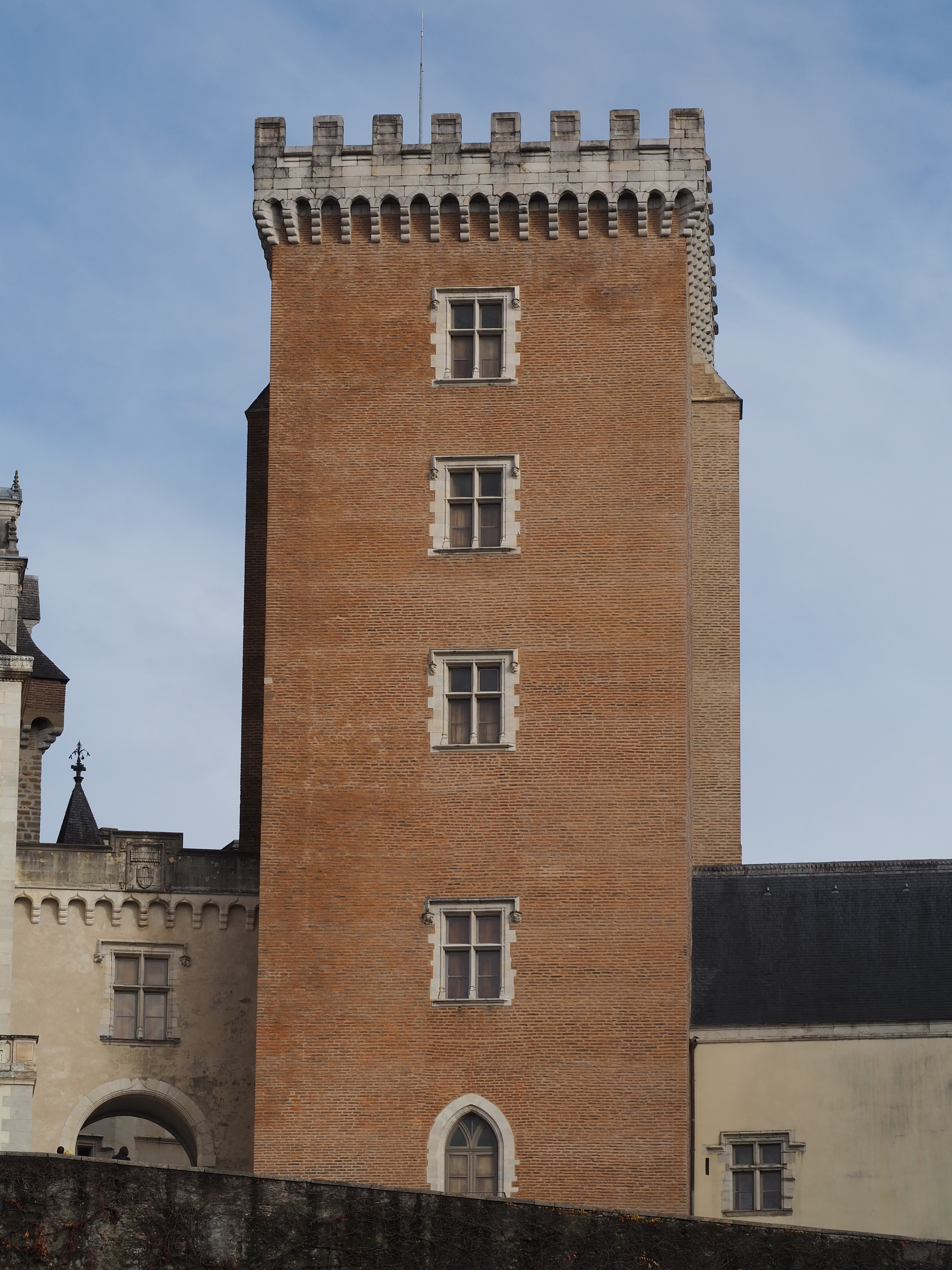
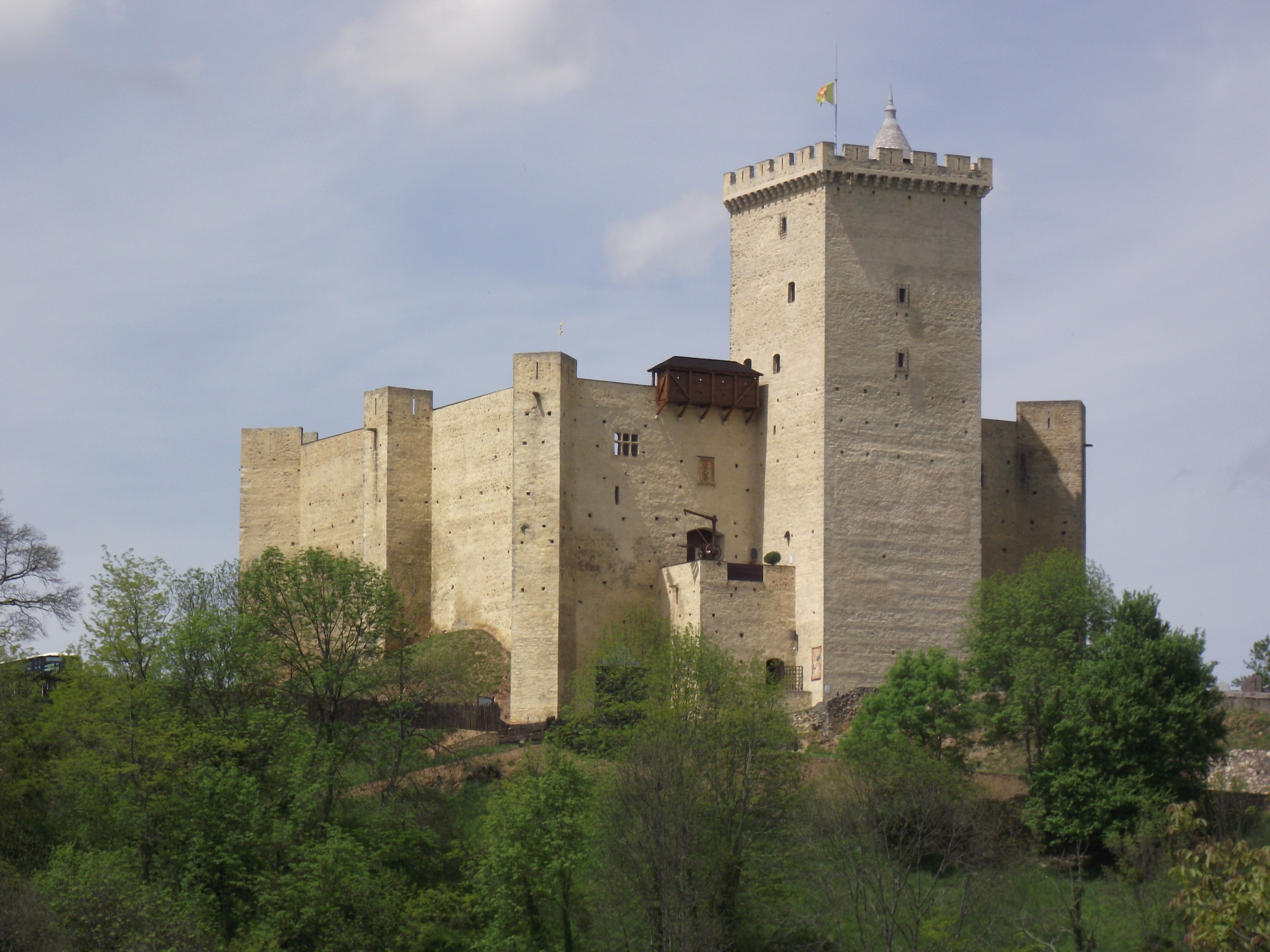
Fébusian constructions. Clockwise from upper left: Château de Montaner, Château Moncade, Château du Pau, Château de Mauvezin, and Château de Morlanne.

=== Residences ===
Fébus held court at the Château Moncade in Orthez, only occasionally visiting his other Béarn castles, except for that of Pau from 1375. When in Foix, Fébus would typically reside at the Château de Pamiers or the Château de Foix, but from 1375 on, he stayed exclusively at the Château de Mazères while in Foix. During his reign, Fébus welcomed notable figures in his residences: the Black Prince in Mazères in 1355, King Peter I of Cyprus in 1363–1364 and the Duke of Bourbon in 1388 in Orthez, and Charles VI at Mazères in 1390. Archaeological studies show, as at Montaner and Orthez, that the "Fébusian" residences were composed of a seignorial main building with multiple levels. The ground floor was used by his servants, and the top floor was reserved for the lord and his entourage.

The great hall was the primary space for all public and courtly life. At the Château Moncade, the great hall was possibly decorated with hunting scenes and tapestries illustrating the Battle of Launac. Froissart's long visit to Orthez, between 1388 and 1389, allows us to describe court life under Fébus. The large hall, or tinel, hosted events such as feasts, literary evenings, minstrel songs, and other celebrations. Troubadours frequently performed at Orthez, but contrary to the medieval fashion, Fébus never held tournaments. Froissart also noted that the court of Orthez was well informed of the latest events, thanks to Fébus' intelligence network.

Fébus installed a treasure room and a prison on the vast ground floor of the tower of the Château Moncade. The first floor served a defensive function with arrow loops built into the tower, while the upper levels were devoted to living quarters. Each level of the living quarters was equipped with four large sitting windows with cushions and a hearth, likely commissioned by Fébus in 1374, concurrently with those of the Montaner tower. The adjoining main building, accessible by the grand staircase opening onto the courtyard, contained the state room, which was located on the first floor, betwixt the servile spaces on the ground floor and the living quarters on the second floor.

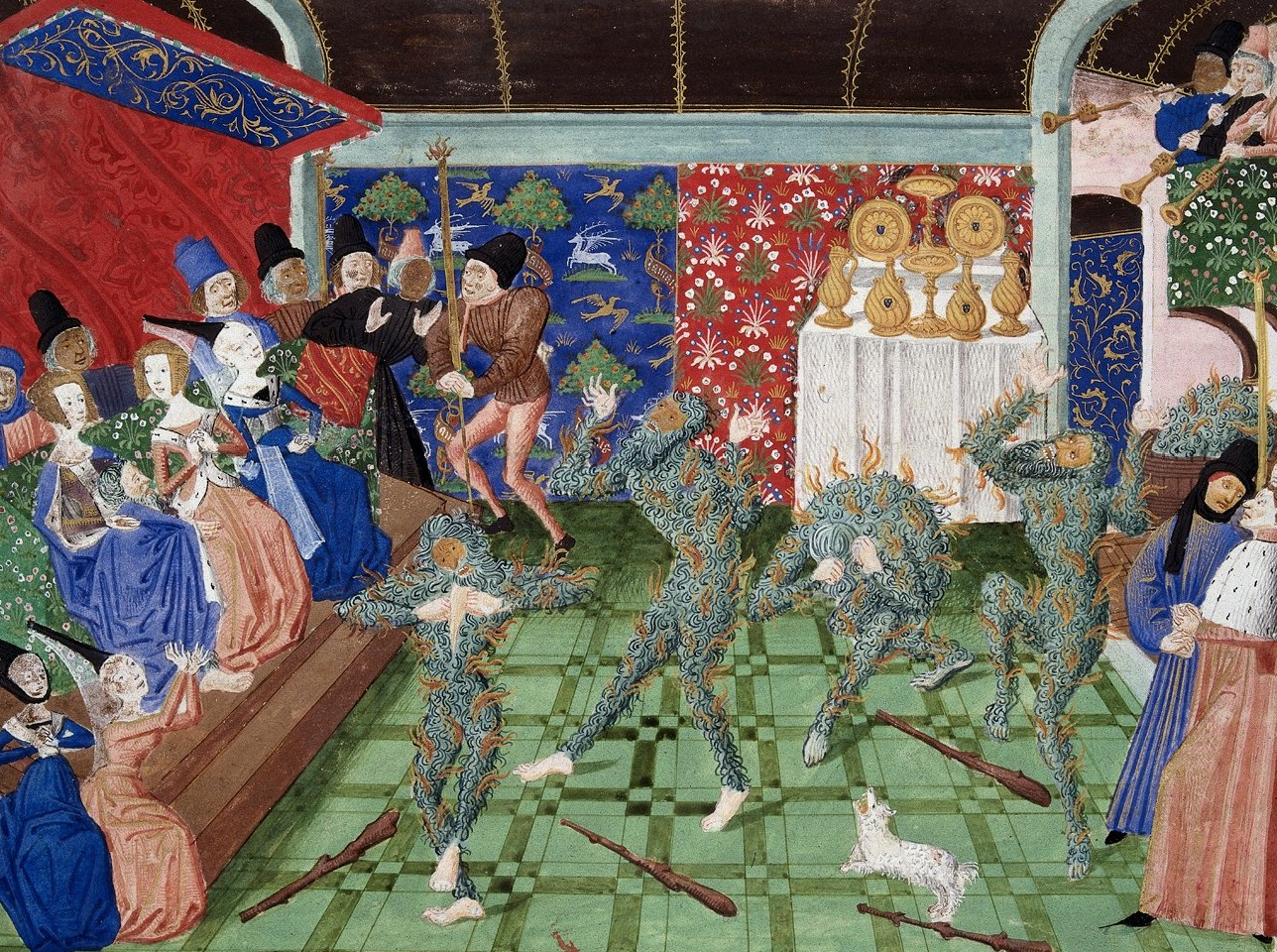
Yvain died in 1393 following the Bal des Ardents incident. Chronicles of Froissart. BL, Harley 4380, f° 1.

=== Illegitimate issue ===
Fébus fathered at least three illegitimate children; (Note: A fourth child named Perenaudet is cited by La Chesnaye-Desbois in 1866 in his Dictionnaire de la noblesse; this child is not cited anywhere else.) the names and social conditions of his mistresses are unknown. Circa 1350, Bernard, Gaston's first illegitimate son, was born. Bernard was established in Castile thanks to the protection of King Henry II of Castile, and he became the first Count of Medinaceli. Bernard appears alongside his father during the War of Comminges in 1376. By his marriage to Isabel de la Cerda, Bernard was the only one of his children to give direct descendants to Fébus.

Fébus' second illegitimate son, Yvain, was born shortly before Gaston, around 1361. Yvain was described as Fébus' favorite child. He was already in his father's personal guard in 1376, and he led the Béarn troops in 1381 during the victory at Rabastens. Froissart also describes Fébus and Yvain as inseparable. (Note: Froissart describes this scene during the death of Fébus: "The knights who were there looked at Yvain, his son, who wept and lamented [...]; they said to him: Yvain, it is done. You have lost your lord father; we know well that he loved you above all.") After the death of Fébus, Yvain's attempt to gain control of the Orthez treasury failed, but he recovered 100,000 florins, as well as furniture, during the division of property. Yvain then moved to the court of France with the support of Joan II, Countess of Auvergne, entering the immediate entourage of King Charles VI. Yvain was one of the organizers of the parties given at the Hôtel Saint-Pol. He participated on 28 January 1393 at a costume ball that would become the famous Bal des Ardents. Yvain is one of the six nobles burned during the fire caused by the torch of Louis I, Duke of Orléans. He died childless on 30 January 1393 as a result of his wounds.

The third son, Gratien, was born later. Very little is known about this child. He is reported for the first time by Froissart at the 1388 Christmas banquet before reappearing at the time of his father's death. He could have taken part in the Barbary Crusade (Note: Also known as the "Mahdia Crusade", it was a Franco-Genoese expedition aimed at punishing the Barbary pirates of Mahdia in Tunisia.) organized by Louis II, Duke of Bourbon in Tunisia, before his death in 1394 in Sicily.

Only Froissart's story allows us to know the daily life of Fébus, but despite the physical and intellectual form of the prince, no woman is present in the court of Orthez. Far from having physically detested them, Fébus seems to have had a psychological aversion towards women, which could explain the repudiation of Agnes as well as the absence of women throughout his life, except for his mother, Aliénor.

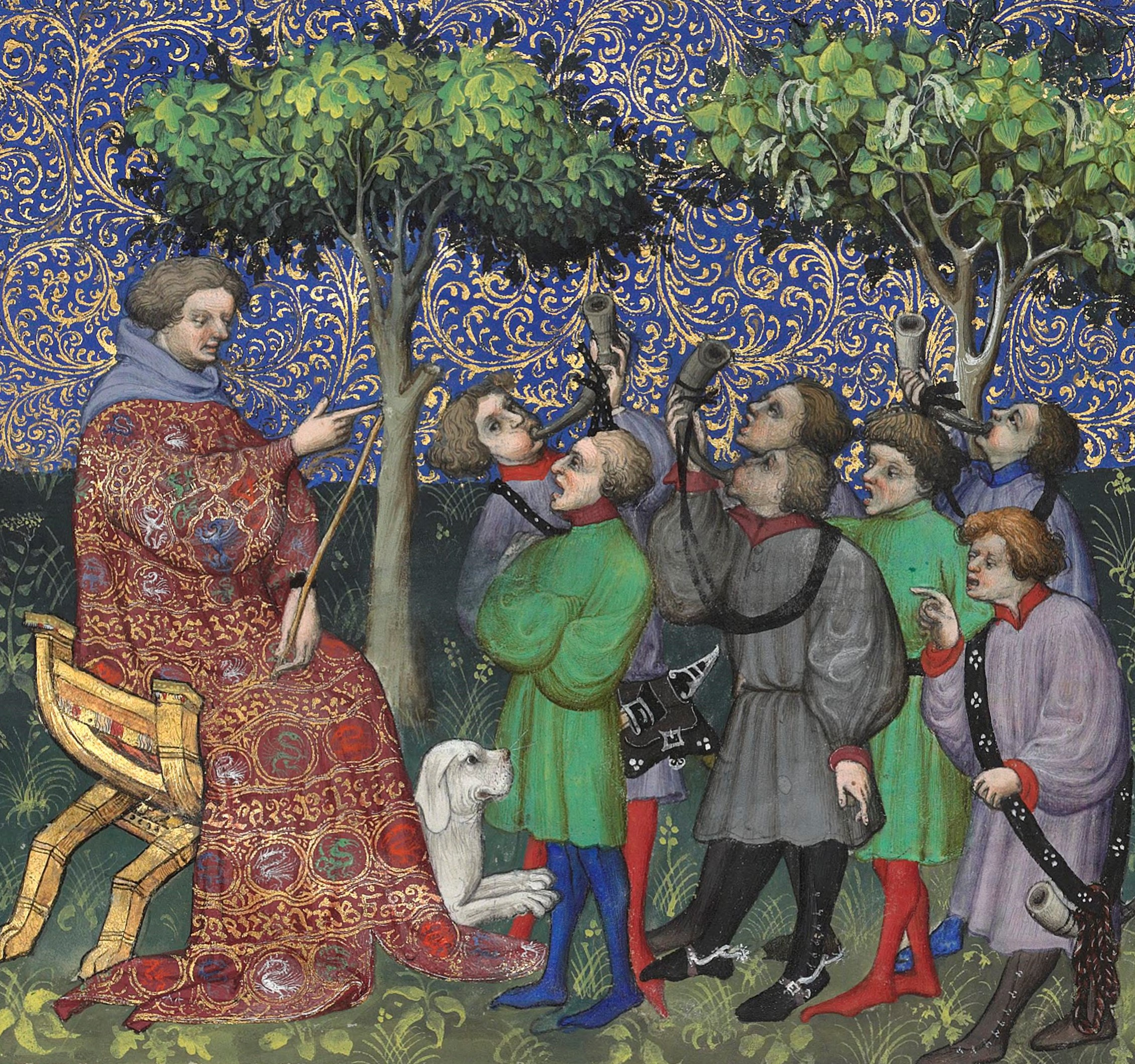
Fébus teaching his huntsmen to corner and hoot. Livre de chasse, Paris, BnF, Fr.616, f° 54 r°.

== Personality, appearance, and presentation ==
=== Personality and behavior ===
Apart from his predilection for war and hunting, he worked at night and slept for most of the day, not typically waking until noon. Fébus' assiduity in regards to his work is one of his primary behavioral traits, himself specifying in the prologue to his Livre de chasse that despite his passion for the hunt, it never led him to "neglect the service of his own affairs who must import more." The registers of his notary also prove his total availability to his princely duties, exerting permanent administrative pressure. Fébus commanded his men with brief orders, applying the same method to his dogs, for whom he was devoted and which accompanied him at all times. Juvénal des Ursins wrote of the complexity of Fébus' character, "He had been a valiant prince in his time and subjugated his neighbors, and he was well loved, honored, and prized, feared and dreaded."

=== Appearance ===
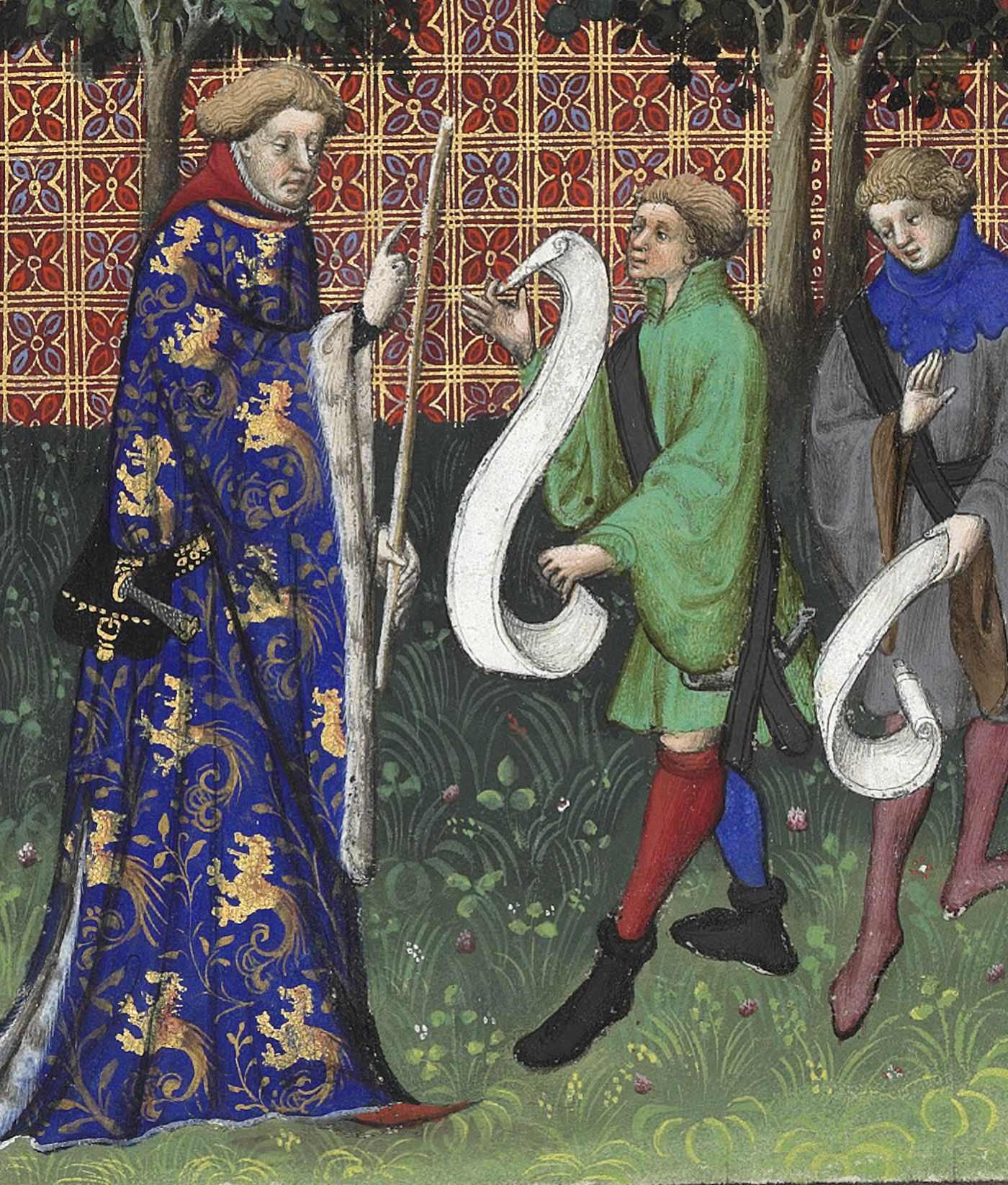
"The Count of Foix who was a handsome prince, of beautiful form, of beautiful height, bare-headed with disheveled hair because he never wore a hood" from Froissart's Chronicles

The physical appearance of Fébus is not precisely known. A motet describes his "flaming hair". Froissart describes him as having "such beautiful limbs, such a beautiful look, such a beautiful figure, the beautiful face, sanguine and laughing, and the green eyes, in love where it pleased him to cast his gaze" There are many illuminated manuscripts representing his features and his presence, but they depict an imagined and fictitious Fébus. The most famous version of the Livre de chasse is Fr. 616 dated 1407. This version is commissioned by John the Fearless; it is based on another manuscript, now in the Hermitage Museum, commissioned by Fébus and possibly dedicated to the Duke of Burgundy. Fébus' hair is blonde in this version. All these elements describe a handsome man, with lively eyes and blond hair. Fébus would have worn sumptuous clothing similar to those in manuscript Fr. 616 of the Livre de chasse, with decorations symbolizing his power. Geoffrey Chaucer wrote of Fébus in similar terms to Froissart: "He was the most beautiful man in the world who was or had been since the beginning of the world. What need is there to describe his features. Because in this world there was no one alive who was so beautiful."

=== Moniker ===
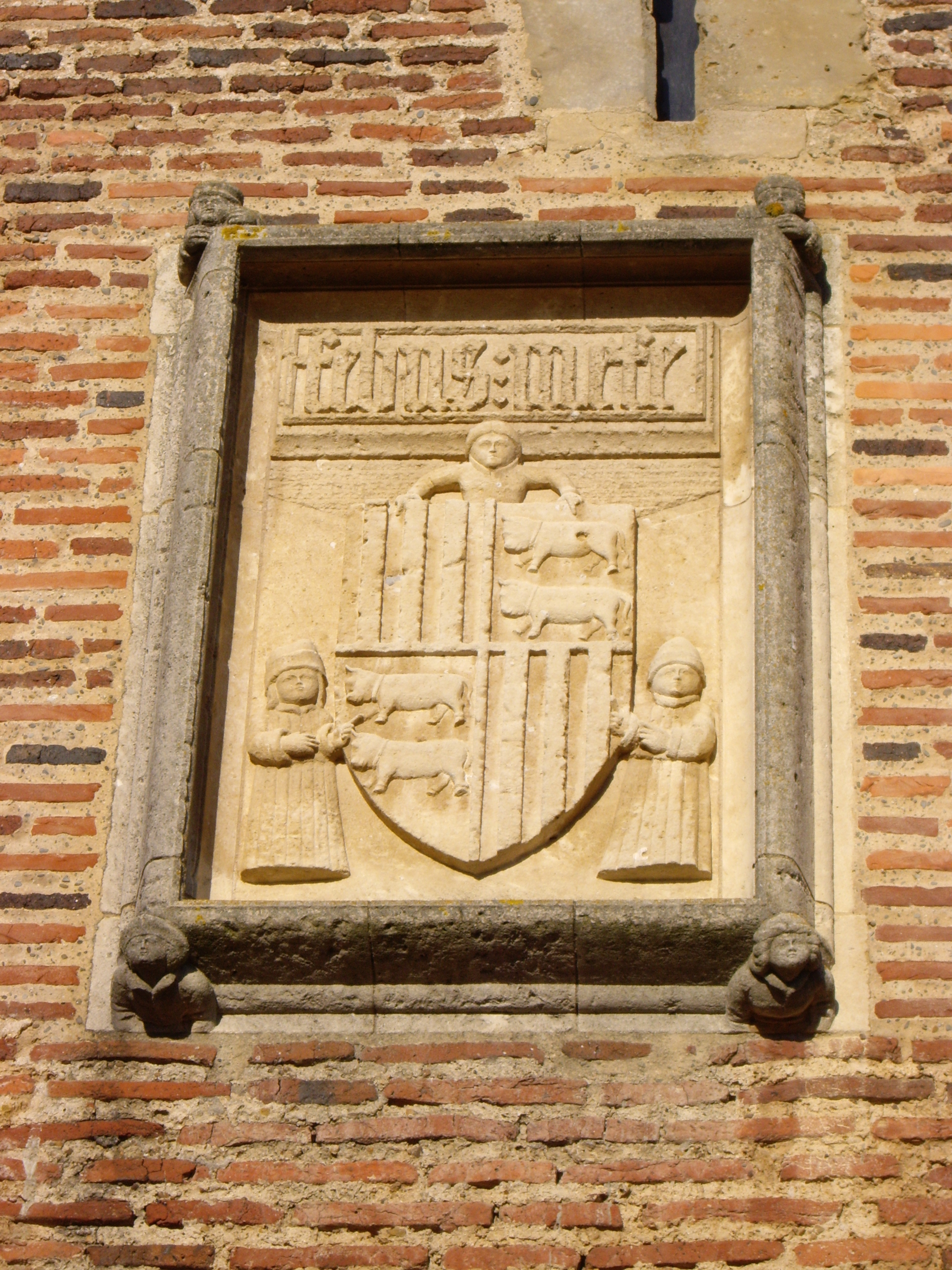
The inscription Febus me fe at Château de Montaner.

Gaston III of Foix-Béarn gradually replaced his birth name with his chosen name of Fébus. In the middle of the 14th century, he was one of the first European princes to use a handwritten signature. But, uniquely, Fébus elected to sign by his chosen name. The oldest preserved document featuring the Fébus signature dates from 16 April 1360; the general look of this signature does not change until 1390, when Fébus adopted a clearly visible and detached signature. He also used his chosen name in the minting of his coins with the inscription Febus comes and by placing the inscription Febus me fe on his fortresses. In 1387, when he wrote the prologue to his Livre de chasse, he specified his identity: "I, Gaston by the grace of God, nicknamed Fébus, count of Foix, lord of Béarn."

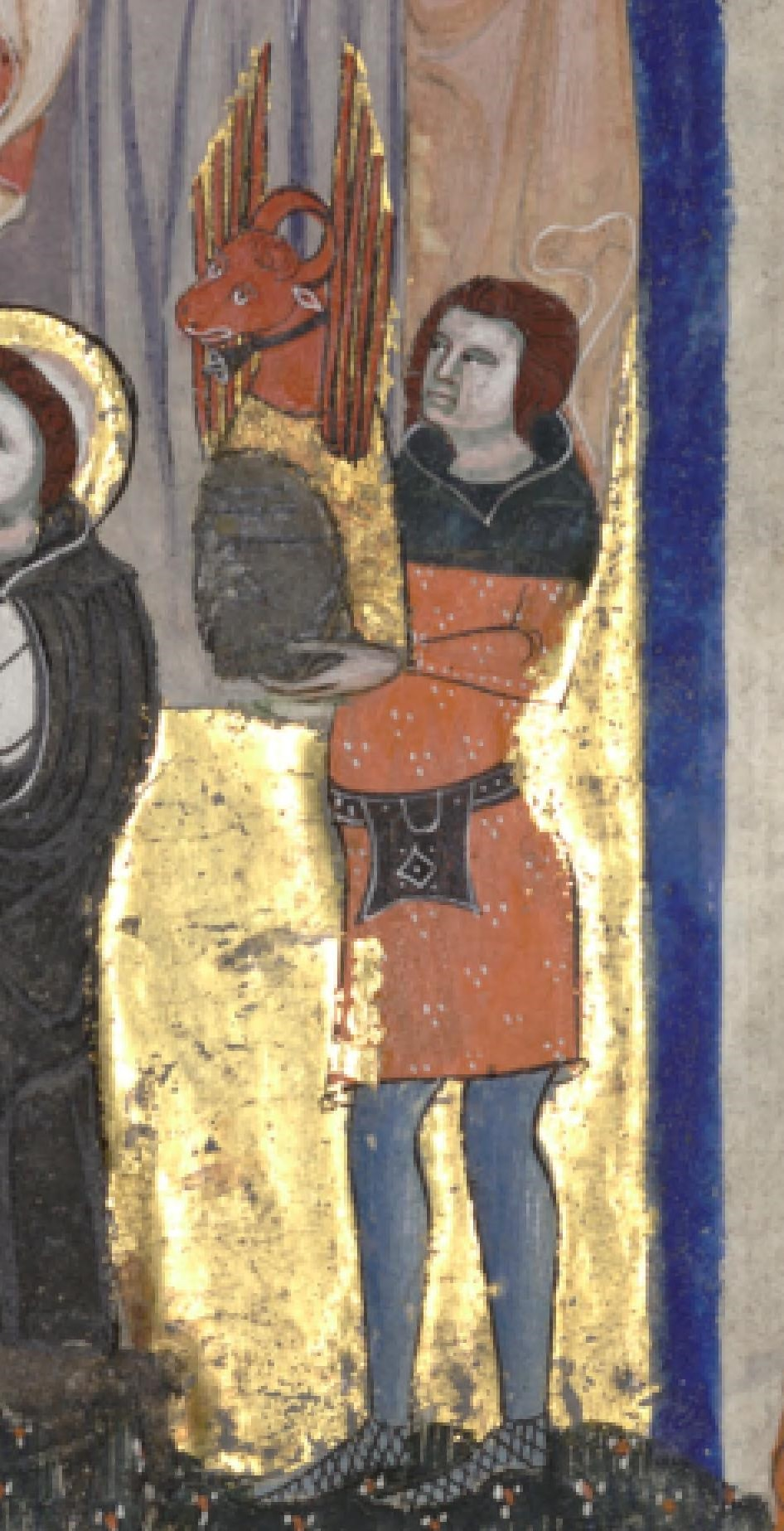
Fébus chooses a Béarnaise cattle's head to top his helm. Elucidari de las proprietatz, BSG, ms. 1029, f° 10 r°, detail.

Fébus always used the Occitan spelling, and never Phébus or Phœbus. He also never combined "Gaston Fébus" as has been done since the 19th century, always separating his given name and his chosen name. Fébus as a name was, after his death, borne by other members of the family, including Francis Phoebus of Navarre, who was king of Navarre from 1479 to 1483. Several other names have been used in relation to Fébus, including "Comte soleil", (Note: In reference to his signature Febus comes on his coins.) "Prince des Pyrénées" or "Lion des Pyrénées."

=== Motto and other symbols ===
During the Prussian crusade, he adopted his motto Toquey si gauses ("Touch it if you dare") to illustrate his enthusiasm for arms. This phrase has remained the motto of Orthez. Fébus used two types of seal during his rule. The first appeared in 1341 and was used until at least 1361. This seal is simple, taking only the arms of Foix-Béarn. From 1377 and until the end of his life, Fébus used another more detailed seal featuring a quartered shield of Foix-Béarn, surmounted by a crest combining a bassinet and a cow's head with its bell in a dominant position. The cow's head represents the Béarnaise cattle and the coat of arms of Béarn. A hypothesis presented by Tucoo-Chala and supported by several historians, the dominant position of the head of the cow indicates Béarn's sovereignty. Fébus retained his father's coat of arms, despite his marriage to Agnes, (Note: Fébus could have added the arms France-Navarre, as well as Comminges for his mother.) he also retained the Béarn register for his seal and crest.

=== Personal life ===
==== Hunting ====
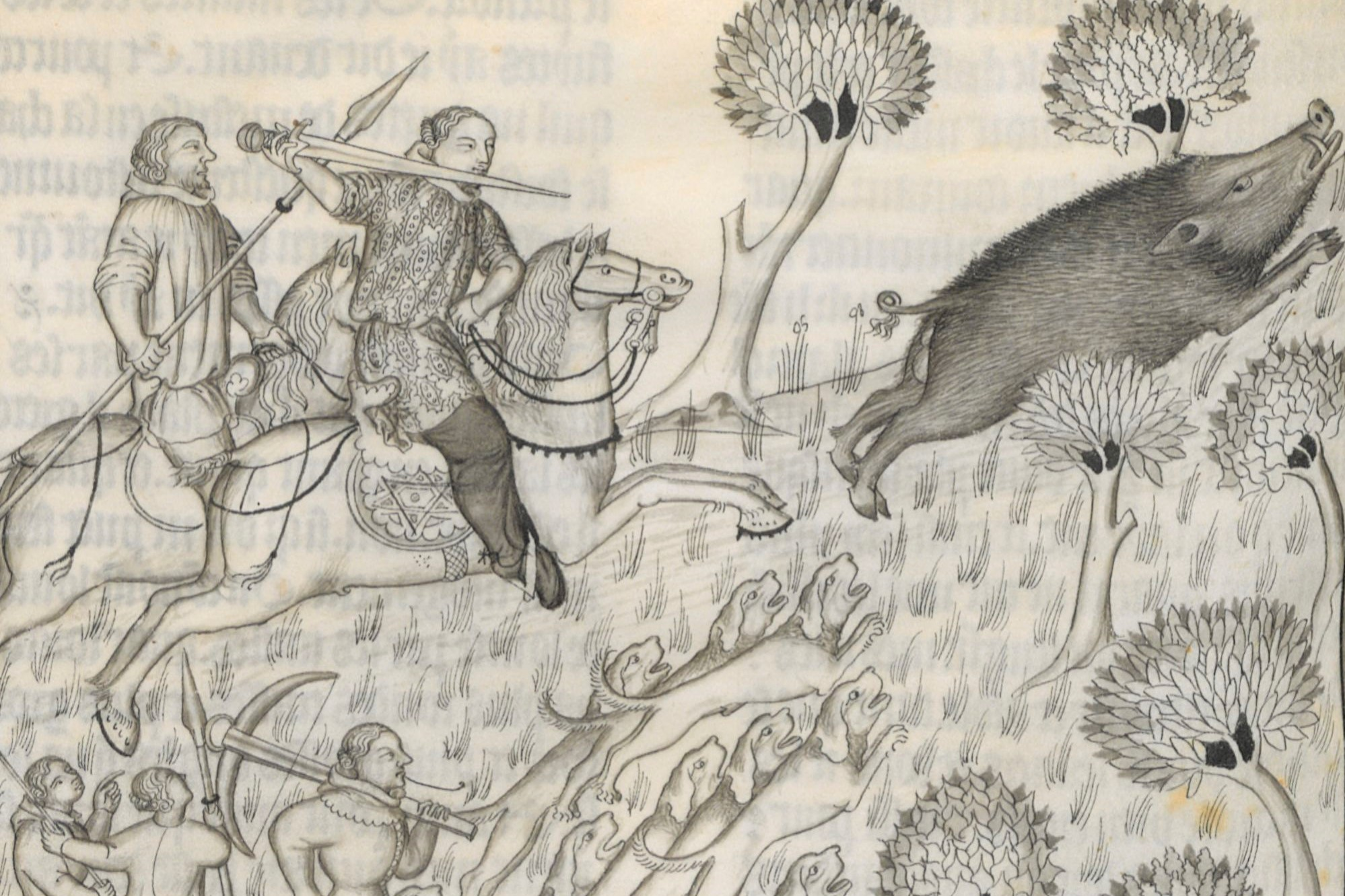
Febus hunting wild boar. Livre de chasse, circa 1390, Paris, BnF, Fr.619, f° 83 v°19.

Fébus was considered one of the greatest hunters of his time. Hunting was omnipresent in Fébus' daily life; the Château Moncade is surrounded by hunting grounds with stag and fallow deer, while the great hall was decorated with animal paintings and hunting trophies. As early as 1344, when he was 13 years old, the archives indicate that Aliénor alone received the homage of the delegates of Josbaig because Gaston III was hunting at the time. King John I of Aragon and the Black Prince sought Fébus' advice on hunting. From 1387, Fébus devoted all his free time to hunting. At the same time, he dictated his Livre de chasse to his secretaries, devoting a good part of his nights in Orthez to it until 1390. The work, dedicated to Philip the Bold, Duke of Burgundy and written in French, (Note: Fébus did not choose the langue d'oc, his mother tongue, but the langue d'oïl to ensure a wider circulation.) occupies a prominent place in medieval hunting literature. (Note: The book was described by Hannele Klemettilä as "one of the most influential texts of its era." Some forty-four 15th and 16th century illuminated manuscripts survive, the most famous being the one held by the Bibliothèque nationale de France, which has miniatures throughout illustrating the hunt.) The book's clarity and detail made it an immediate success, and the naturalist Georges-Louis Leclerc, Comte de Buffon, was still using it at the end of the 18th century. In his book, Fébus puts forward several arguments to explain his passion for hunting: it prepares for war, ensures better health, (Note: For Fébus, the hunter must eat moderately and follow strict hygiene to remain fit.) allows one to commune with nature, and opens the doors to paradise.

==== Writing ====
Fébus was capable of composing poetry (cansos), religious literature (the Livre des oraisons), a scientific work (the Livre de chasse), writing in langue d'oc, Latin, and French. Born and raised in Orthez, Fébus' mother tongue was Béarnese, but he was also able to speak other Occitan dialects such as Gascon Commingeois or Foix Languedocien. Froissart records that he "very willingly spoke to me not in his native Gascon but in proper and elegant French". Béarnese remained his everyday language. Fébus also mastered the langue d'oc written, codified, and unified by the troubadours. He wrote his cansos in this language, though only one has survived. This canso, which appears in a Provençal songbook (chansonnier) of 18 pieces, was presented after 1342 at the Consistoire de la gaie science of Toulouse, ancestor of the Académie des Jeux Floraux. Likely written by a Fébus in his mid-20s, takes on the classic theme of a burning lover's lament for an unapproachable lady.

In addition to his Livre de chasse, he wrote a Livre des oraisons, a collection of 37 prayers, the first three of which are in Latin, and the others in French. Fébus addresses God directly, frightened by his life of sin but showing absolute confidence in divine mercy. The most widespread hypothesis is that the Livre des oraisons follows the Drama of Orthez. Claudine Pailhès in her work Gaston Fébus – Le Prince et le Diable believes this collection would be the fruit of a crisis due to a "sin of the flesh", in the words of Fébus. In addition to his talents as an author, Fébus built up a rich library in Orthez. He collected books with translations into langue d'oc of the Elucidari of Bartholomaeus Anglicus and the Surgery of al-Zahrawi, but also adaptations of many books including Valerius Maximus, the Speculum Maius by Vincent of Beauvais, and the Book of the Marvels of the World by Marco Polo.

== Works ==
- Gaston Fébus (2002). Le Livre de chasse – introd. et notices de Claude d'Anthenaise; avant-propos de Christian de Longevialle (in French). Paris: Maison de la chasse et de la nature. p. 94. BnF 38857330.
- Gaston Fébus (1974). Le Livre des oraisons – édition critique avec traduction par G. Tilander et P. Tucoo-Chala. Pau: Marrimpouey. p. 137.

== See also ==
- Castle of Foix
- Château de Mauvezin

== Notes & references ==
=== Sources ===
- Tucoo-Chala, Pierre (1976). Gaston Fébus : un grand prince d'Occident au XIVe siècle. Pau: Marrimpouey.
- Froissart, Jean; Ainsworth, Peter F.; Croenen, Godfried (2007). Chroniques (in French). Librairie Droz. ISBN 978-2-600-01100-6.
- Sumption, Jonathan (1999). The Hundred Years War. Philadelphia: University of Pennsylvania Press. ISBN 0-8122-3147-3. OCLC 42960989.
- Massie, Jean-François (October–December 1986). "À l'ombre de Fébus: Arnaud-Guilhem de Béarn, seigneur de Morlanne (vers 1330-vers 1397)". Annales du Midi (in French). XCVIII (176): 469–483. doi:10.3406/anami.1986.2118.
- Tuchman, Barbara W. (2007) [1978]. A Distant Mirror: The Calamitous 14th Century. Random House Publishing. ISBN 978-0-3452-8930-8.
- Lamazou-Duplan, Véronique (2014). Signé Fébus, comte de Foix, prince de Béarn: Signatures, écritures et pouvoirs autour de Gaston III, comte de Foix (in French). Somogy et Université de Pau et des Pays de l'Adour. ISBN 978-2-7572-0864-9.
- Pailhès, Claudine (2007). Gaston Fébus – Le Prince et le Diable (in French). Ėditions Perrin. ISBN 978-2-262-02355-3.
- Tucoo-Chala, Pierre (2009). Gaston Fébus, grand prince médiéval (in French). Ėditions Atlantica. ISBN 978-2-7588-0228-0.
- Tucoo-Chala, Pierre (1991). Gaston Fébus, prince des Pyrénées (in French). Ėditions Deucalion. ISBN 2-906483-43-5.

=== Further reading ===
==== Chronicles ====
- Michel du Bernis (1839). J.A.C. Buchon (ed.). Chroniques des comtes de Foix (in French). Paris: Desrez.
- Jean Froissart (1987). Geneviève Brunel-Lobrichon (ed.). Voyage en Béarn (in French). Paris: Olivier Orban. p. 227
- Juvénal des Ursins (1839). Jean Alexandre Buchon (ed.). Histoire de Charles VI, roi de France (in French). Paris: Desrez.
- Pierre Olhagaray (1609). Histoire de Foix, Béarn et Navarre (in French). Paris: Douceur. p. 797.

==== Historical studies ====
- Bouillet, Marie-Nicholas; Chassang, Alexis (1878). "Gaston III de Foix-Béarn". Dictionnaire universel d'histoire et de géographie. Hachette.
- Cummins, John (18 January 2001) The Hound and the Hawk: The Art of Medieval Hunting. Publ. Weidenfeld & Nicolson; New paperback edition ISBN 978-1842120972.
- Gaucheraud, Hippolyte (1834). Histoire des comtes de Foix de la première race: Gaston III dit Phœbus. Paris: Levavasseur.
- Lagabrielle, Sophie (2011). Gaston Fėbus : Prince Soleil (1331–1391) (in French). Paris: Ėditions de la Rmn – Grand Palais. ISBN 978-2-7118-5877-4.
- Nabonne, Bernard (1936). Gaston Phébus, seigneur du Béarn, 1331-1391 (in French). Paris: R.-A. Corrêa. BnF 32477397.
- Febus Avant! Music at the Court of Gaston Febus, Count of Foix and Bearn (1331-1391); Huelgas Ensemble, Paul Van Nevel; Sony, 1992.

==== Articles ====
- Gales, Françoise (April 2020). "Des châteaux signés Fébus". Le Festin (in French) (113): 98–105. ISBN 978-2-36062-252-8. ISSN 1143-676X.

==== Novels ====
- Dumas, Alexandre (2000) [1839]. Monseigneur Gaston Phœbus: Chronique dans laquelle est racontée l'histoire du démon familier du sire de Corasse (in French). Atlantica. BnF 37191239
- Myriam and Gaston de Béarn, novel trilogy La Vie fabuleuse de Gaston Phébus:
  - Gaston Phébus: Le Lion des Pyrénées (in French). Paris: Mengès. 1978. BnF 34639089
  - Gaston Phébus: Les Créneaux de feu (in French). Paris: Mengès. 1978. BnF 34639090
  - Gaston Phébus: Landry des Bandouliers (in French). Paris: Mengès. 1979. BnF 34639091
- Jeanroy, B. A. (1905). La Vengeance d'Amaury (in French). Hachette.
- Tucoo-Chala, Pierre; de Huescar, José (1985). Gaston Fébus et le Prince Noir (in French). Portet-sur-Garonne: Loubatières. BnF 34979340

==== Comics ====
- Catmalou and Joseph Lacroix, Febus trilogy:
  - Febus: Zénith (in French). Atelier In8. 2017. p. 32.
  - Febus: Soleil noir (in French). Atelier In8. 2017. p. 32.
  - Febus: Éclipse (in French). Atelier In8. 2017. p. 32.
- Pierre Tucoo-Chala and Patrick Amblevert, deux tomes:
  - La Jeunesse de Fébus (in French). Portet-sur-Garonne: Loubatières. 1996. BnF 39211473
  - La Gloire de Fébus (in French). Portet-sur-Garonne: Loubatières. 2004. BnF 39193252

=== External links ===
- Works by Gaston III of Foix at Project Gutenberg
- Exposition virtuelle : Le Livre de chasse de Gaston Fébus on the BnF website
- Véronique Rébé, Gaston Fébus et le Château de Pau au XIVe siècle, National Museum of the Château de Pau

Preceded by Gaston II & IX	Count of Foix; Viscount of Béarn; Viscount of Marsan; 1343–1391	Succeeded by Matthew
Preceded by Gaston II & IX	Prince of Andorra; 1343–1391 with Pere de Narbona (1343–1347); Nicola Capocci (1348–1350); Hugó Desbach (1351–1361); Guillem Arnau de Patau (1362–1364); Pedro Martínez de Luna (1365–1370); Berenguer d'Erill i de Pallars (1370–1387); Galcerand de Vilanova (1388–1391)	Succeeded by Matthew
