= List of French photographers =

This is a list of photographers who were born in France or whose works are closely associated with that country.

== A ==
- Carole Achache (1952–2016)
- Olympe Aguado (1827–1894)
- Jacques Alexandre (born 1944)
- Georges-Louis Arlaud (1869–1944)
- Hippolyte Arnoux
- Yann Arthus-Bertrand (born 1946)
- Eugène Atget (1857–1927)
- Alan Aubry (born 1974)

== B ==
- Edouard Baldus (1813–1889)
- Bruno Barbey (1941–2020)
- Jean Baudrillard (1929–2007)
- Hippolyte Bayard (1801–1887)
- Alfred Beau (1829–1907)
- Christophe Beauregard (born 1966)
- Laurent Benaïm (born 1965)
- Gilles Bensimon (born 1944)
- Pierre Berdoy (born 1936)
- Laurent Biancani (1933-2003)
- Auguste-Rosalie Bisson (1826–1900)
- Louis Désiré Blanquart-Evrard (1802–1872)
- Félix Bonfils (1831–1885)
- Edouard Boubat (1923–1999)
- Alexandra Boulat (1962–2007), photographer
- Jacques Bourboulon (born 1946)
- Mohamed Bourouissa (born 1978)
- Jean-Christian Bourcart (born 1960)
- Guy Bourdin (1928–1991)
- Adeline Boutain (1862–1946), photographer, postcard publisher
- Bruno Braquehais (1823–1875)
- Brassaï (1899–1984), Hungarian-born French photographer
- Adolphe Braun (1812–1877)
- Serge Brunier (born 1958)
- Jean-Marc Bustamante (born 1952)

== C ==
- Bernard Cahier (1927–2008)
- Claude Cahun (1894–1954)
- Sophie Calle (born 1953), photographer and other media
- Henri Cartier-Bresson (1908–2004)
- Jean Chamoux (1925–2007)
- Jean-Philippe Charbonnier (1921–2004)
- Désiré Charnay (1828–1915)
- Germaine Chaumel (1895–1982)
- Clark and Pougnaud, art duo composed of photographer and painter
- Antoine Claudet (1797–1867)
- Paul de Cordon (1908–1998)

== D ==
- Louis-Jacques Daguerre (1787–1851)
- Luc Delahaye (born 1962)
- Édouard Delessert (1828–1898), painter, archaeologist and photographer
- Patrick Demarchelier (1943–2022)
- Thomas Devaux (born 1980)
- André-Adolphe-Eugène Disdéri (1819–1889)
- Louis-Camille d'Olivier (1827–1873)
- Robert Doisneau (1912–1994), photographer
- Pierre Dubreuil (1872–1944), photographer
- Maxime Du Camp (1822–1894)
- Louis Arthur Ducos du Hauron (1837–1920)
- Jean Louis Marie Eugène Durieu (1800–1874)
- Raymond Depardon (Born 1942)

== E ==
- Philippe Echaroux (born 1983)
- Wilfrid Esteve (born 1968)

== F ==
- Antoine Fauchery (1823–1861)
- Bernard Faucon (born 1950)
- Flore (born 1963), French-Spanish photographer and daughter of the painter Olga Gimeno
- Hércules Florence (1804–1879)
- Fernand Fonssagrives (1910–2003)
- Vincent Fournier (born 1970), Burkina Faso-born Paris-based photographer
- Auguste François (1857–1935)
- Charles Fréger (born 1975), portrait photographer
- Jean-Baptiste Frénet (1814–1889)

== G ==
- Jules Gervais-Courtellemont (1863–1931)
- Léon Gimpel (1873–1948)
- Joseph-Philibert Girault de Prangey (1804–1892)
- André Giroux (1801–1879)
- Jean-Pierre Gilson (born 1948)
- Jean-Paul Goude (born 1938), French graphic designer, illustrator, photographer
- Vincent Goutal (born 1971)
- Yohann Gozard (born 1977)
- Olivier Grunewald (born 1959)
- Emile Gsell (1838–1879)

== H ==
- Lucien Hervé (1910–2007), Hungarian-born French photographer
- Henri Huet (1927–1971)

== I ==
- Dominique Issermann (born 1947)
- Jules Itier (1802–1877)

== J ==
- Gaspard-Pierre-Gustave Joly de Lotbinière (1798–1865)
- Jean-François Jonvelle (born 1943)
- Valérie Jouve (born 1964), photographer, filmmaker

== L ==
- Eric Lafforgue (born 1964)
- Suzanne Lafont (born 1949), photographer, installation artist
- Frédéric Lagrange
- Céline Laguarde (1873-1961), member of the Pictorialist movement
- John Launois (1928–2002), photojournalist
- Jacques Henri Lartigue (1894–1986)
- Louis Legrand
- Gustave Le Gray (1820–1884)
- Henri Le Secq (1818–1882)
- Ange Leccia (born 1952), photographer, filmmaker
- Jean-François Lepage (born 1960), photographer
- Auguste and Louis Lumière
- Serge Lutens (born 1942)

== M ==
- Dolorès Marat (born 1944)
- Étienne-Jules Marey (1830–1904)
- Charles Marville (1816–1879)
- Pascal Meunier (born 1966)
- Jean-Baptiste Mondino (born 1949)
- Bruno de Monès (born 1952)
- Sarah Moon (born 1941)
- Vincent Munier (born 1976)
- René Maltête (Born 1930)

== N ==
- Nadar (1820–1910)
- Joseph Nicéphore Niépce (1765–1833), inventor of photography

== O ==
- Dani Olivier (born 1969)
- André Ostier (1906–1994)

== P ==
- Gilles Peress (born 1946)
- Pierre et Gilles, photography duo
- Jean Philippe Piter (born 1968)
- Bernard Plossu (born 1945)
- Michel Poivert (born 1965), photography historian, president of Société française de photographie
- Kate Polin (born 1967)
- Herman Puig (1928–2021), Cuban-born photographer and filmmaker
- Constant Puyo (1857–1933)

== R ==
- Réhahn (born 1979)
- Gérard Rancinan (born 1953)
- Henri-Victor Regnault (1810–1878)
- Bettina Rheims (born 1952), photographer
- Marc Riboud (1923–2016), photographer
- Olivier Roller (born 1972)
- Dominique Roman (1824–1911)
- Willy Ronis (1910–2009), photographer
- Georges Rousse (born 1947), photographer

== S ==
- Lise Sarfati (born 1958), photographer
- Jean-Louis Schoellkopf (born 1946), photographer
- Stéphane Sednaoui (born 1963)
- Jeanloup Sieff (1933–2000)
- Camille Silvy (1834–1910)
- Hedi Slimane (born 1968)
- Albert Spaggiari (1932–1989)
- Christine Spengler (born 1945)
- Alex Strohl (born 1989)

== T ==
- Chloé Tallot (born 1973)
- Antoine Tempé (born 1960)
- Jean-Baptiste Tournassoud (1866–1951), photographer and military officer
- Pierre Toutain-Dorbec (born 1951)
- Natalia Turine (born 1964)

== V ==
- Pierre de Vallombreuse (born 1962)
- Benedicte Van der Maar (born 1968)
- Xavier Veilhan (born 1963), photographer, other media
- Jean-Marie Villard (1828–1899)
- Jean-Michel Voge (born 1949)
- Franck Vogel (born 1977)

== W ==
- Evrard Wendenbaum (born 1979)
- Albert Willecomme (1900–1971)
- Wols (1913–1951), German photographer who worked in France

== Y ==
- Muammer Yilmaz

== Z ==
- Patrick Zachmann (born 1955)

== See also ==
- List of French women photographers
- List of photographers
