= Jean Philippe Piter =

French photographer

- Born: 4 April 1968 (age 58); Dakar, Senegal
- Occupation: Photographer
- Website: jeanphilippepiter.com

Jean Philippe Piter (born 4 April 1968) is a Senegalese-born French photographer, known for his fine-art nudes. Alongside his work as a photographer, he is also the founder and art director of the magazine Pure St Barth, which was first published in 2003.

== Biography ==
Jean Philippe Piter was born on 4 April 1968 in Dakar, Senegal. At the age of 16, he left Dakar and moved to France where he began his studies in photography. He was assistant to many known photographers in the industry, including Michel Comte, Jacques Durand and Yann Arthus-Bertrand.

His work has appeared in publications, including Architectural Digest, CitizenK, Vanity Fair, W, Photo, Numéro, and British Vogue and has shot advertising campaigns for Google Glass and Audemars Piguet.

Piter's work has been published in several books, including The Eye of St Barth, Liaigre 2 (Flammarion), Liaigre 3 (Flammarion), Living in Delphi (Assouline), The Eye of Saint-Barth (Pure).

He is represented by Space Gallery St Barth where his fine-art photography is showcased and sold.

== See also ==
- List of Senegalese
- List of French photographers
