= Louis Legrand (disambiguation) =

Louis Legrand (1863–1951) was a French artist known especially for his aquatint engravings

Louis Legrand may also refer to:

- Louis Legrand (theologian) (1711–1780), French Sulpician priest and theologian, and a Doctor of the Sorbonne
- Louis Legrand (photographer) (19th century), French photographer
- Metta Victoria Fuller Victor (1831–1885), American novelist who used the nom de plume Louis Legrand among others

== See also ==
- Lycée Louis-le-Grand, a French secondary school
