= Jacques Alexandre =

French photographer

Jacques Alexandre is a French photographer known for his artistic photography in two main artistic styles: First his romantic "impressionism period" in the 1970s, influenced by the impressionism paintings and then his "hyperrealistic period" starting in the 1980s, with straight compositions and strong colors. He is also well known for his lifestyle images for the medias worldwide.

== Education ==
He received his artistic training at the Academy of Fine Arts in France and his photographic training at the State College of Photography in Cologne, Germany (Graduated Photo-Designer).

== Career and style ==
Right after his graduation in 1968, he started working as fashion and advertising photographer for Willy Gursky, the father of Andreas Gursky. In 1969 he was head photographer for advertising and fashion in the advertising studios of the department store Kaufhof in Cologne, Germany. From 1970 until 1975 he worked as freelance cameraman for the German television station WDR. During this time he began doing work for international art publications in a romantic soft focus style, being influenced by the Impressionism and Romantic Era.

His further successes included dozens of photographic books, calendars, posters, puzzles with combined sales well into the millions. Besides his main theme of depicting natural young women, couples and children, Jacques Alexandre also made pictures of landscapes, flowers and still life. Several of his photographs which included look like oil paintings. Most of his work gives an impression of timelessness because it was made in a preserved nature without buildings, cars and people. His photography was compared to painters like Caspar David Friedrich, Claude Monet or Pierre-Auguste Renoir.

In the '80s began his "hyperrealistic period", with straight compositions and strong colors, also for photographic books, calendars, posters, puzzles and magazines. His new style was reported in prestigious magazines like Zoom and Photo Magazine, Paris, France. As printed art works declined because of the emerging technologies, Jacques Alexandre decided to also create photographs for the medias and make his images accessible worldwide through stock agencies.

In 1998 he published his own printed photo catalogue "The Best Of Jacques Alexandre" for the leading Stock Agencies (DIN A4, 208 pages, 85.000 copies) with 1.008 images of kids, families, beauty, lifestyle, landscape, nature, stills and artistic works. Today, 8,000 images by Jacques Alexandre can be found worldwide through Stock Agencies.

In the 80s and 90s, Jacques Alexandre used to spend every year several months on the Spanish island of Ibiza and in Southern France and worked with mostly natural, non-professional models. In the 90s, he started large life style photo productions for stock in Southern France and on the Maldives with a staff of professional models, assistants and makeup artists. The artistic images of Jacques Alexandre contain no after effects in the photo laboratory or digitally, everything has to be done during the photo shooting. This process requires an exact concept, organisation, preparation and meticulous working on the set, nothing must be subject to fortuity.

== Awards ==
- 1966 – 1st Award of the Franco-German Youth Office (FGYO)
- 1970 – Award of the Asahi Pentax World Photo Contest
- 1980 – Kodak Photo Book Award for his children book "The Little Red Cat", published by Belser Reich Verlag, Lucerne, Switzerland

== Selected books ==
- "Der kleine rote Kater" (The Little Red Cat), 1980 – Belser Reich Verlag, Switzerland – ISBN 3-7941-2138-4
- "The best nudes", 1981 – Haga Shoten, Japan
- "Jacques Alexandre 1", 1982 – NGS, Japan – ISBN 4-89011-034-8 C3072
- "Jacques Alexandre 2", 1982 – NGS, Japan – ISBN 4-89011-067-4 C3072
- "Aktfotos meisterhaft gestalten", 1992 – Knapp Verlag, Germany – ISBN 3-87420-170-8
- "Jacques Alexandre", 1994 – NGS, Japan – ISBN 4-89011-348-7

== Selected magazine pictorials ==
Magazine	Month	Year	Country	Description
Playboy	February	1975	Germany	8 pages of the "Playmate of the Year"
Color Foto	June	1976	Germany	4 pages photo essay about Jacques Alexandre
Color Film	April	1977	Germany	Cover and 12 pages, photo essay
Mode und Wohnen	April	1979	Germany	6 pages, report Ibiza house
Color Foto	October	1979	Germany	Cover and 10 pages photo essay about Jacques Alexandre
Color Foto	December	1980	Germany	8 pages photo essay about Jacques Alexandre
Color Foto	April	1982	Germany	Cover by Jacques Alexandre
Color Foto	September	1982	Germany	Cover and 7 pages, photo essay about Jacques Alexandre
Zoom	December	1982	France	Cover and 6 pages, photo essay about Jacques Alexandre
Photo	October	1982	France	Cover and 8 pages, photo essay about Jacques Alexandre
Color Foto	April	1982	Germany	Cover by Jacques Alexandre
Fotoheft	April	1982	Germany	Cover by Jacques Alexandre
Color Foto	October	1984	Germany	Cover and 6 pages, photo essay about Jacques Alexandre
Color Foto	January	1987	Germany	Cover and 8 pages photo essay about Jacques Alexandre
Foto	January	1987	Germany	8 pages photo essay about Jacques Alexandre
Foto	January	1990	Germany	6 pages, photo essay about Jacques Alexandre
The Regent		1990	China	8 pages, photo essay about Jacques Alexandre
Color Foto	November	1990	Germany	6 pages photo essay about Jacques Alexandre
Das Magazin	May	1996	Germany	6 pages, photo essay about Jacques Alexandre
