= Olivier Roller =

French photographer

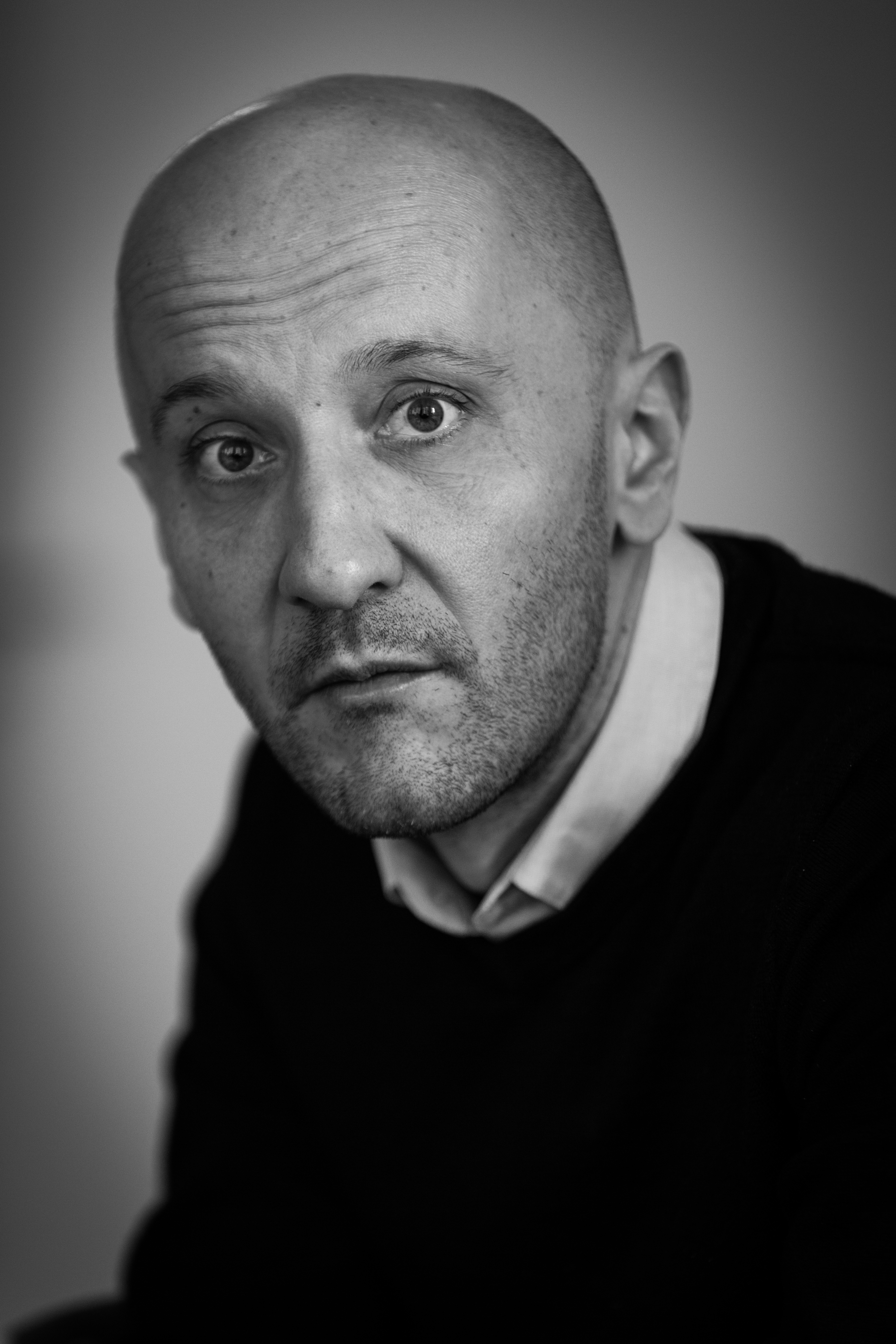
- Olivier Roller par Claude Truong-Ngoc mars 2015
- Born: 1972 (age 53–54); Strasbourg
- Occupation: French photographer

Olivier Roller (born 1972 in Strasbourg) is a French photographer based in Paris. He specializes in photographic portraits, and since 2009 he has been creating photographic frescos. The images are about individuals of power, which he places in settings or poses reminiscent of historic portraits, from antiquity to Napoleon, creating portraits of the "emperors of today."

== Biography ==
After studying political science and law studies in Strasbourg, Olivier Roller became a photographer.

He describes power and influence in France in the beginning of the 21st century through the individuals who represent them (ministers, financiers, advertisers, media leaders…)

If the power is immutable, men of power are friable. […] What is photographed is a changing power, pending, maybe disappearing. […] The power is that dream to challenge time, knowing that time will be stronger. […] The men of power knows what he lost

— Olivier Roller

=== The beginnings ===
Olivier's first portrait was of his grandfather in 1994, in a very tight frame and devoid of artifices.

While he was still a student he took an interest in photography. To find faces to photograph, he approached many writers and filmmakers who were promoting their work in bookstores and venues. This promptly led to the press giving him assignments.

=== Jeanne Moreau ===
While on assignment, Oliver followed Jeanne Moreau to a film festival in Belgium. Back in Paris, he contacted her to ask if he could photograph her. He wanted to move away from assignments and instead photograph the subjects more authentically and realistically. This photograph is now the cover of the book Visage by Bruno Chibane, gathering 20 years of portraits of assignments of Olivier Roller.

=== Figures of power ===
In 2008, the Musée du Louvre gave him carte blanche in the following terms: "Would you like to work on the equivalent of Sarkozy (the French president) and Fillon (Sarkozy's prime minister), 2000 years ago?". He spent every Tuesday (public closure’ day) for six months, all alone in the Gallery of Antiques.

In the following year, he set out to confront the faces of today's "emperors" (financiers, publicists, intellectuals, diplomats, politicians, etc.) with their counterparts of the past (from the Roman emperors to Napoleon). He contacts the men of power and proposes to them that they come to make a portrait in his studio, and to become a face hanging on the wall of an exhibition. This project is still in progress.

=== The influence of surfing ===
In the collective book West is the Best, Olivier Roller speaks about his surfing practice, that he compares to photography.

Being in the ocean, in the middle of the waves, allows him to not think but just be present. He describes this practice as "a symbolic vehicle for advancement" and explains that surfing has allowed him "to reach a certain animality" and "reconnect with reality.". Olivier Roller explains that he loves the shifting, unpredictable, and even disappointing side of surfing. The same applies to photography. He compares photography to the ocean: "It has nothing against you, but you will never be able to dominate it, you just have to be humble."

== Exhibitions ==
- 2017–2018: Musée du Louvre, « Théâtre du Pouvoir » septembre 2017 à juillet 2018
- 2017: Centre des monuments nationaux, château d'Angers, installation La Cathédrale de fil
- 2017: Maison européenne de la photographie, acquisitions récentes – Paris
- 2016: Palazzo Al-Temps / musées nationaux romains, Rome
- 2016: « Les larmes de la terre », The Temple (Pékin), Banpo (Xi-An), Changsha, Dunhuang – Chine
- 2015: « Oser la photographie », musée Réattu, Arles
- 2015: « Carte blanche à Olivier Roller », Mobilier national, musée des Gobelins, Paris
- 2015: « Aller Dehors », La Criée, centre d’art contemporain, Rennes
- 2014 « Figure di potere », Spazionuovo, Rome
- 2014 « Lumières », musée Cognacq-Jay, carte blanche à Christian Lacroix, Paris
- 2013: « Mon île de Montmajour », abbaye de Montmajour, centre des monuments nationaux commissariat Christian Lacroix, Arles
- 2013 « Rodin, la lumière de l’antique », musée de l'Arles antique, Arles
- 2010–2013 « Figures du pouvoir 1 », exposé à :
  - La Filature, Mulhouse
  - Musée des Moulages, Lyon
  - MIA Art Fair, Milan
  - Villa Aurélienne, Fréjus
  - SpazioNuovo, Rome, festival Foto Roma
  - Festival Fotoleggendo, Rome
  - Grange de Dorigny, Lausanne & participation au colloque universitaire « Le visage dans tous ses états »
  - Musée de la photographie André Villers, Mougins
  - Institut culturel de Fukuoka (Japon)
  - Institut franco-japonais, Tokyo

== Publications ==
- Années 2010
  - 2016: Nefta – Éditions de l'Air, des livres. Photographies prises dans les environs de Nefta dans le desert Tunisien, lieu de tournage des premiers Star Wars. ISBN 978-2-9526699-5-5
  - 2015: Visage mis à nu – Regard sur 20 ans de portraits – 304 pages – 200 portraits. Sous la direction de Bruno Chibane. Contributions ou interviews de Rodolphe Burger, Jean-Claude Brisseau, Daniel Cohn-Bendit, Christophe Donner, Clara Dupont-Monod, Mike Hodges, Julia Kerninon, André S. Labarthe, Jean-Luc Nancy, Nathalie Quintane... Chic Média Éditeur ISBN 978-2-9544852-0-1
  - 2011: 10 MAI 81, une journée particulière, accompagnée de textes d'Emmanuel Lemieux, Bourin Éditeur ISBN 978-2-84941-231-2
- Années 2000
  - 2007: Face(s), 31 écrivains réagissent au portrait qu'Olivier Roller a fait d'eux, éditions Argol ISBN 978-2-91597-821-6
  - 2005: Clarita's Way (bilingue français – anglais), exergue de Gertrude Stein, postface de Clara Dupont-Monod, traduction de Philippe Aronson, L'opossum Éditions ISBN 978-295209-420-7
  - 2002: Aperghis, kaléidoscope d'une résidence, textes d'Isabelle Freyburger, Jempresse Éditions & Desmaret ISBN 978-291367-523-0
