= Bruno de Monès =

French photographer (born 1952)

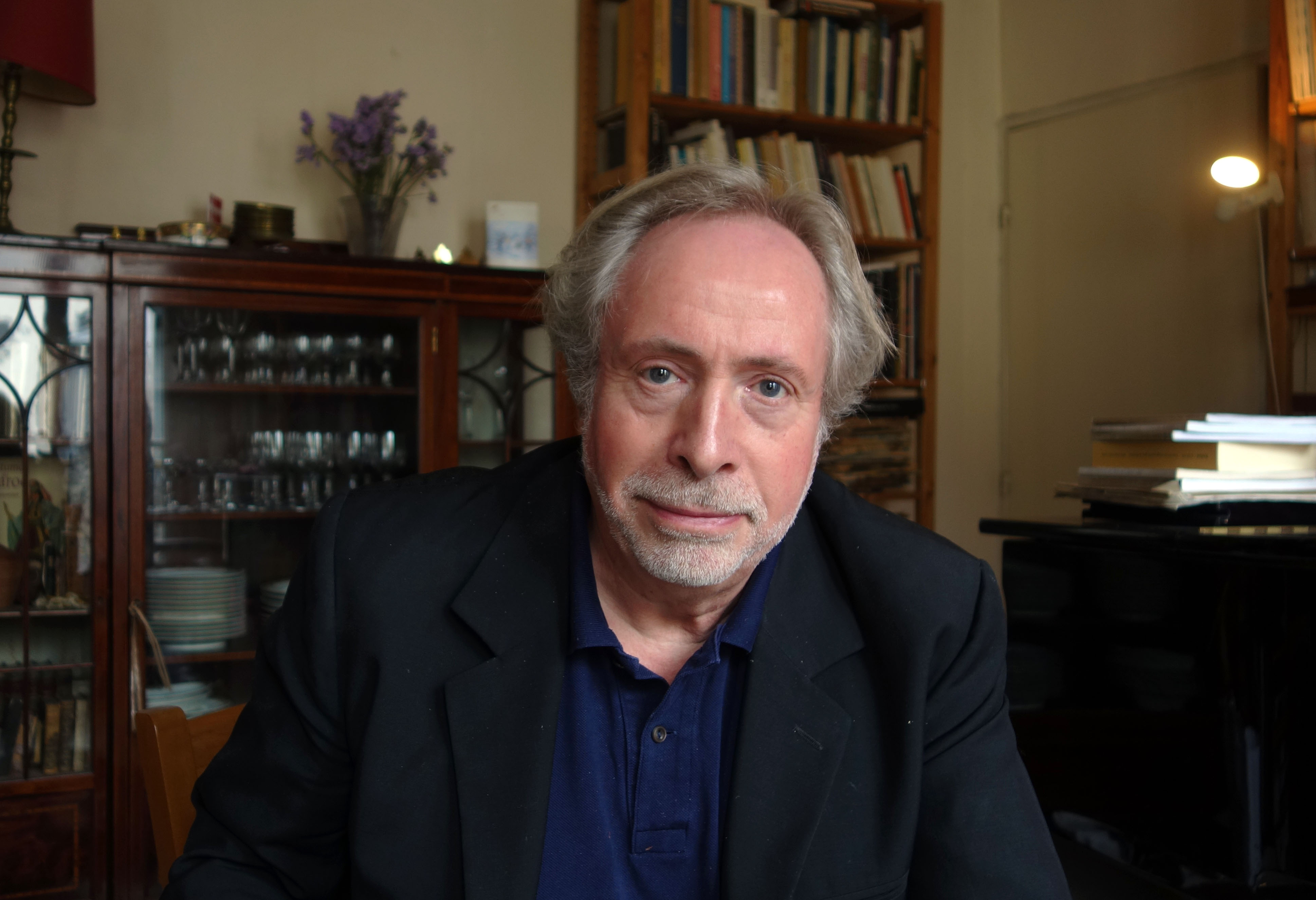
- Bruno de Monès, 2016
- Born: 11 February 1952; Orléans, France
- Occupations: Photographer, screenwriter
- Website: brunodemones.com

Bruno de Monès is a French photographer, born 11 February 1952 in Orléans. He is known for his black and white portraits of artists and intellectuals such as Klaus Kinski, Charles Aznavour, Salvador Dalí, Burt Lancaster and Claude Lévi-Strauss.

== Life ==
After having spent his teenage years in Morocco, Bruno de Monès moved to Paris in the mid-seventies. He became the assistant of fashion photographer Jean Clemmer; then, in 1976, he joined the audiovisual department of the Charles of the Ritz / Yves Saint Laurent perfumes company as photographer and assistant director. During this time, he decided to make portraits of personalities from the arts. These black and white pictures in sharp contrast were the subject of an exhibition at the Espace Canon (Les Yeux du miroir, Paris, 1980) and were published in a photograph album (Visages connus, faces caches.)

In the years 1980–1990, he worked for newspapers and was one of the official photographers of the Magazine Littéraire. He took famous photographs of numerous writers and intellectuals. He also worked in the ads and fashion with essentially Japanese published works. In 1994, he was one of the founders of the Mois off de la photo in Paris.

In 2010, a retrospective exhibition on his work was organised in Paris (Théâtre de l'Odéon). More than 100 portraits were exhibited under the arcades of the theatre and in the streets around. Since the 1980s until today, the works of Bruno de Monès are published in French newspapers and magazines. The photographer is also frequently published in Europe, America and Asia. Since 2010, he has been working on scriptwriting projects.

== Bibliography ==
- Visages connus, Faces cachées, La Butte aux Cailles (1983)
- The Fourfold View of a Star, Heaven (1993), published in Japan and the United States
- Publication in third-party works:
  - Portraits pour un siècle / Cent écrivains: portraits of Michel Foucault and V. S. Naipaul (Gallimard and Roger-Viollet, 2011)
  - Aznavour en haut de l'affiche, by Charles Aznavour (Flammarion, 2011)
  - "Quelques philosophes": portraits of famous philosophers in La Règle du jeu's issue nr. 74 (dir. Bernard Henri Levy, ed. Grasset, novembre 2021)
- Publication of personal projects:
  - Zoom no. 81, 97, 131
  - Vis à vis International
  - Photographies Magazine
  - Photo Revue

== Significant works ==
- Photographs:
  - Klaus Kinski, 1977
  - Serge Gainsbourg, 1978
  - Françoise Hardy, 1978
  - Burt Lancaster, 1979
  - Michel Foucault, 1984
  - Claude Lévi-Strauss, 1985
  - Gilles Deleuze, 1988
  - Jean Nouvel, 1991
- Fashion: fashion prestige booklet for the clothing line Be Released (Tokyo, 1986)
- Ads:
  - 4m x 3m poster campaign for the concerts of Claude Nougaro in Paris (Olympia) and province, and realisation of two album covers, 1981
  - Advertising campaign (print and display): Paco Rabanne for Japon en 1987
- Intervention in the media:
  - Participations in José Arthur's Pop-Club (France Inter) between 1978 and 1993
  - Le Barbier de nuit (Europe 1) with Léo Malet

== Noteworthy exhibitions ==
- Le Bistrot d'Isa, Paris, Septembre 1977
- Les Yeux du miroir, Espace Canon in Paris, 1980
- Objectif Mode with Thierry Arditti, Cynthia Hampton, Paolo Calia and Satoshi, Galerie Viviane Esders in Paris, 1988
- Gueules de Stars (with Eddy Brière), Galerie-Librairie le 29 in Paris, 2010
- Exposition de 100 portraits de Bruno de Monès au Théâtre de l'Odéon (et autour), rétrospective in Paris, 2010
- Galerie Intuiti, Paris, 2014
