= Albert Willecomme =

French photographer

Albert Willecomme (16 April 1900 – 31 March 1971) was a French photographer.

== Early life ==
Born in Lille, France, he settled in Belgium in the town of Mont-de-l'Enclus. After World War I, he decided that since he was self-taught, he would do photography. He built himself a camera on stands and began photographing walkers in the Enclus woods. He took photos and developed the negative straight away for a quick sale.
