= Jean-Pierre Gilson =

French photographer

Jean-Pierre Gilson (born 25 April 1948) is a French landscape photographer. His work is held in the collections of the Centre Pompidou and Centre régional de la photographie Hauts-de-France.

== Life and work ==
Gilson is from Compiègne, France. He "spent over two years exploring the Somme, immersing himself in the surroundings and the 1916 battlefields", recording "the sites of commemorations, former battlegrounds and military cemeteries".

== Publications ==
- Les Carmélites de Compiègne. Médialogue, 1989.
- Scotland. Créaphis, 1991. With an introduction by Jacques Roubaud.
  - Scotland. Castor & Pollux, 2004.
  - Scotland. Créaphis, Paris, 2019.
- Des Regards et vie. Contrejour (ouvrage collectif), 1991.
- Compiègne en sa Forêt. Plon, 1994.
- Plateau picard. 1995.
- Le don du silence. Ouest-France, 1995.
- Ireland. Marval, 1998.
- Territoires de France. Marval, 2002.
- Rivages. Centre Régional de la Photographie Hauts-de-France, 2006.
- Paysages. Le Temps qu'il fait, 2007.
- Portfolio, Paysages. la Photographie à Aix-en-Provence, Le Temps qu'il fait, 2009.
- Saint-Jean-aux-Bois: portraits d'un village de forêt.
- Compiègne, La ville, la forêt, l'agglomération. Diaphane, 2011; 2017.
- Images en Seine. Point de vues, 2012.
- Claude Monet à Giverny. Martinière, Paris, 2013.
  - Giverny il di Monet. L'Ippocampo, Milan, 2013.
  - Claude Monet's Gardens at Giverny. Abrams, New York, 2013.
  - Claude Monet in Giverny. Hirmer, Munich, 2013.
- Lumières de la nuit. Sicae-Oise, 2014.
- Somme 1916. Loco, Paris, 2016.
- Théâtre Impérial de Compiègne. Théâtre Impérial, 2017.
- Front de l'aube. des Cendres, 2017.
- Les gens d'à bord. La cité des bateliers, 2018.
- Traces 1918–2018. Office de tourisme du Pays noyonnais, 2018.
- Fromages et vins. Foire aux fromages et aux vins, Compiègne, 2019.
- Lilles-Nice. WYZ bike Challenge, Compiègne, 2019.
- Forêt de Compiègne. Trans Photographic, Paris, 2020.
- Visages & paysages de l'agriculture de l'Oise. Odyssée, 2022.
- English Landscapes. Stockport, UK: Dewi Lewis, 2023. With a foreword by William Boyd. ISBN 9781911306931.
  - Campagne anglaise. Trans Photographic, 2023. ISBN 979-1090371552.

== Exhibitions ==
- Paris-Roubaix, 2005–2011, Centre régional de la photographie Hauts-de-France, Douchy-les-Mines, France, December 2011 – January 2012

== Collections ==
Gilson's work is held in the following permanent collections:

- Centre Pompidou, Paris, France: 2 prints (as of 28 September 2023)
- Centre régional de la photographie Hauts-de-France, Douchy-les-Mines, France: 14 prints (as of 28 September 2023)
