= Germaine Chaumel =

French artist

Germaine Chaumel (22 or 30 November 1895 in Toulouse – 12 April 1982 in Blagnac) was a French photographer, singer, pianist, hatmaker and illustrator.

== Personal life ==
Chaumel was from an artist family; her father loved painting, her mother was a pianist and her uncle, Antonin Provost, a photographer. She studied singing and piano at the lycée de jeunes filles de Saint-Sernin. She married Pierre Grand in 1919, with whom she had a son, Bernard, in 1922. She divorced him a year later and married Chales Chaumel that same year, with whom she had a daughter, Pâquerette "Paqui", in 1925.

At the beginning of World War II, she put a Jewish family from Antwerp up in her home.

== Career ==
She became an operetta singer in 1925, under the name of Anny Morgan, at the Théâtre du Capitole de Toulouse. She played Manon in Les Saltimbanques, Marguerite in Faust and also in L'Auberge du Cheval blanc, La Fille de madame Angot and Lakmé. In 1933, she stopped her singing career as well as equestrianism. Thanks to her husband, at the head of the local electrical company, she managed a record shop in Toulouse.
