= Vincent Goutal =

French photographer

Vincent Goutal (born 1971, Rennes, France) is a French photographer. He lives and works in Paris.

== Biography ==
From 1992 to 1997, he studied science at the École normale supérieure (ENS) on rue d’Ulm, in Paris. In 1995 he joined the visual arts department, directed by Chris Killip, at Harvard University (United States). Under his supervision, he produced the series of photographs, ‘American TV,’ found today in the Photographic Collections department at the Museum of Modern Art (MoMa) in New York. In 1997, he returned to France and took classes with Christian Boltanski at the École nationale supérieure des beaux-arts in Paris. From 2000 to 2009, his photographs were exhibited at the Photographic Resource Center in Boston (United States), at the State Russian Museum in Saint-Petersburg, and at the Affordable Art Fair in London.

== Work ==
All the photographic series that Vincent Goutal has produced, up to Transitions (2009), have a social documentary photographic style. For Cuban Impressions (2003–2005), he knocked at one door after another, to photograph the interiors of homes. He does not speak Spanish and his equipment- camera, lights, stand – is not discreet, but he always managed to go in and take photographs, at times without a single word being uttered.

For the Transitions series, Vincent Goutal wrote very elaborate scenarios which describe precise social situations with his partner Olivia Leriche. The shots involve complicated staging where the lighting plays a particular role, like in 1950s film noir genre. The goal is to obtain pictures, of an almost allegorical nature, of stereotypes with a certain social success (businessman, pilot, executive woman) where, however, solitude or incommunicability with others is apparent.

== Bibliography ==
- 2011 Interview de Vincent Goutal et Olivia Leriche dans Fill-In #2.
- 2011 Vincent Goutal et Olivia Leriche font la couverture de Rouge Déclic
- 2011 Vincent Goutal fait la couverture de Magazine Me #9 avec la série American TV.
- 2011 Regards #7, Vincent Goutal & Olivia Leriche "Transitions" pages 34 à 45
- 2010 Private n°49 (International Review of Photographs summer 2010) Vincent Goutal & Olivia Leriche "Transitions" pages 46 à 49
- 2010 Photos Nouvelles n°63 (mai-juin 2010) "In absentia" pages 38 à 43
- 2001 St Petersbourg Vedomocti
- 2001 Journal Smena, St Pétersbourg
- 2001 The Harvard Photographic Journal The New World of Art, « This is America » n°5 p 60
- 1996 The Harvard Photographic Journal The Dudley Review
