= Alfred Beau =

French painter

Alfred Beau (1829 – 11 February 1907) was a French painter, ceramicist and photographer.

== Biography ==
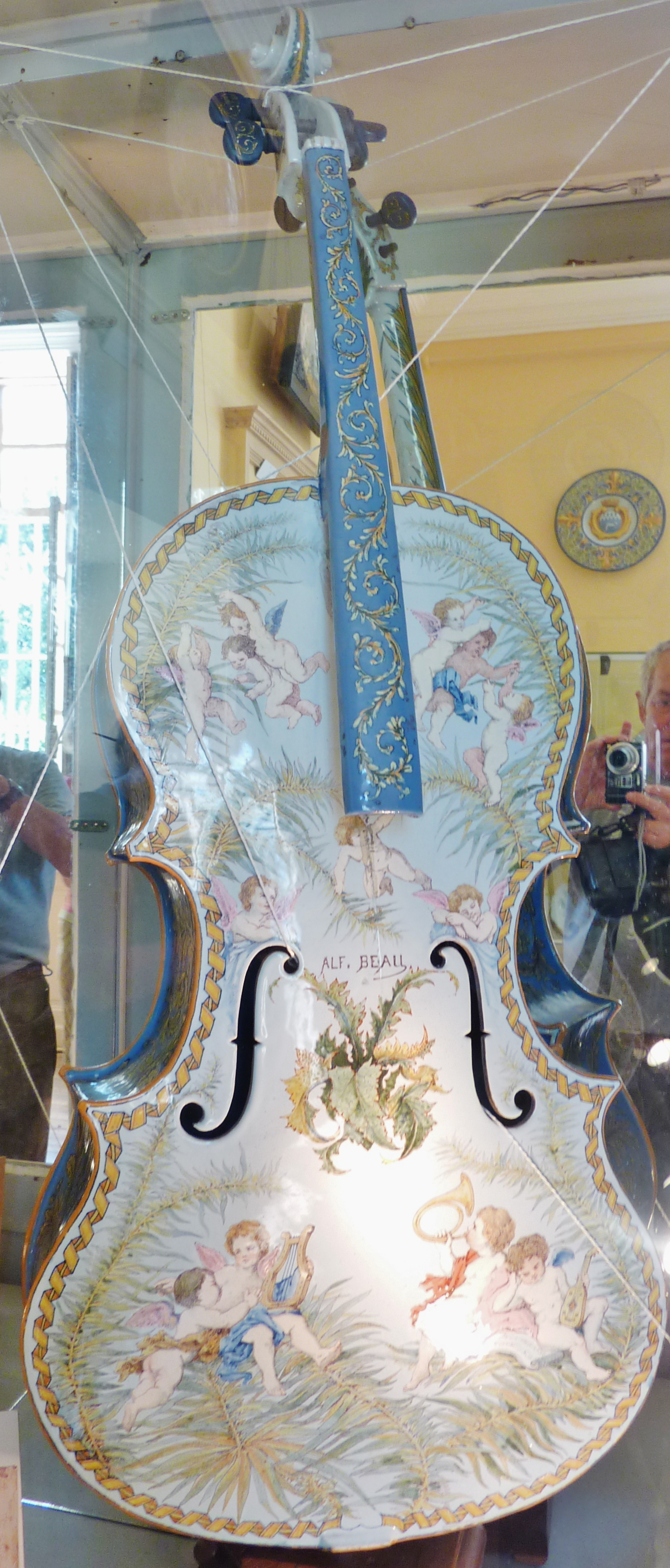
"Violoncelle". This exquisite work of faïence was made by the Porquier factory. It is currently held in the "Manoir de Kerazan" as part of the Astor foundation collection

Beau was born in Morlaix. Encouraged to study design and painting (water-colour), he took the design course run by Prosper Saint-Germain in Morlaix and then set up as a photographer. In April 1857 he married Adah-Ana Souvestre, a daughter of the Morlaix writer Émile Souvestre and his wife Nanine Souvestre-Papot, who was also a writer. Coming under the influence of the ceramist Michel Bouquet, and his interest in ceramics reviving during the time of the Second Empire, he started painting on pottery producing a variety of plates decorated with genre scenes of Breton life, flowers and historic portraits. After 1870, when he had failed to secure work with the "Faïencerie HB-Henriot Quimper" pottery, because Beau insisted on signing his work, he was backed by the widow of Adolphe Porquier and became the artistic director of the Porquier pottery and in time this became Porquier-Beau and their pieces were marked "PB".

Beau exhibited his work both at the Salons and the large "Expositions universelles", in particular at the Universal Exhibition of 1878 where he earned a silver medal for his ceramic violoncello. As his work began to revitalize the ceramic industry in Quimper and other potteries began to copy his style. 1880 saw Beau made "conservateur" at Quimper's musée des beaux-arts. He encouraged the museum to build up their collection of Breton art and he contributed to this collection a diorama depicting a Breton wedding with some forty four mannequins emerging from the chapel all dressed in Breton costume.

He struck up a friendship with Joseph Astor, the then mayor of Quimper, and the owner of the Manoir de Kerazan in Loctudy, which he furnished with works of art. Astor's son, Joseph-Georges Astor, commissioned Beau to curate and complete his father's collection, and the Manoir de Kerazan contains many of Beau's works.

== Works ==
Several of Beau's works are conserved in Brittany, These include :-

- "Violoncelle". This ceramic piece, for which Beau was awarded a silver medal at the Paris "Exposition universelle" of 1878, is held in the Loctudy Manoir de Kerazan.
- "Le premier bonhomme". This oil on canvas painting dating to around 1891 is held in the Saint-Brieuc Musée d'art et d'histoire.
- "'Un amateur de faïence : portrait de M.F". A painting of 1888. Held in Quimper's Musée des beaux-arts.
Other works by Alfred Beau

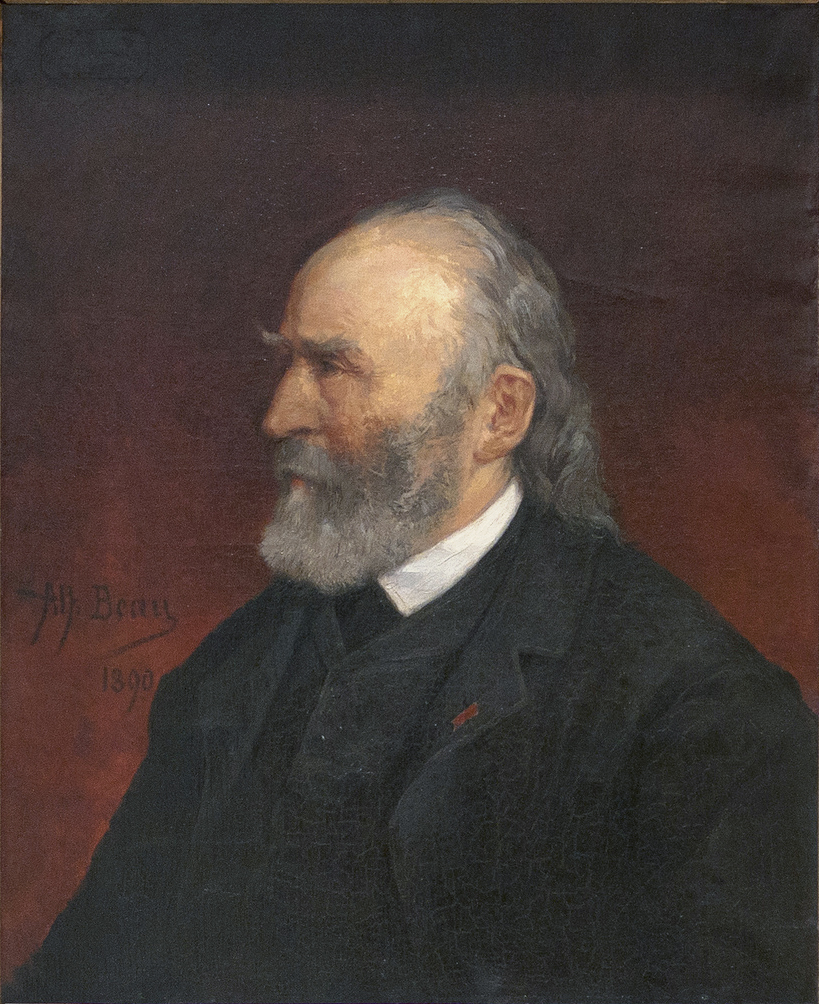
Portrait of François-Marie Luzel by Alfred Beau (1890).Musée des beaux-arts de Quimper.

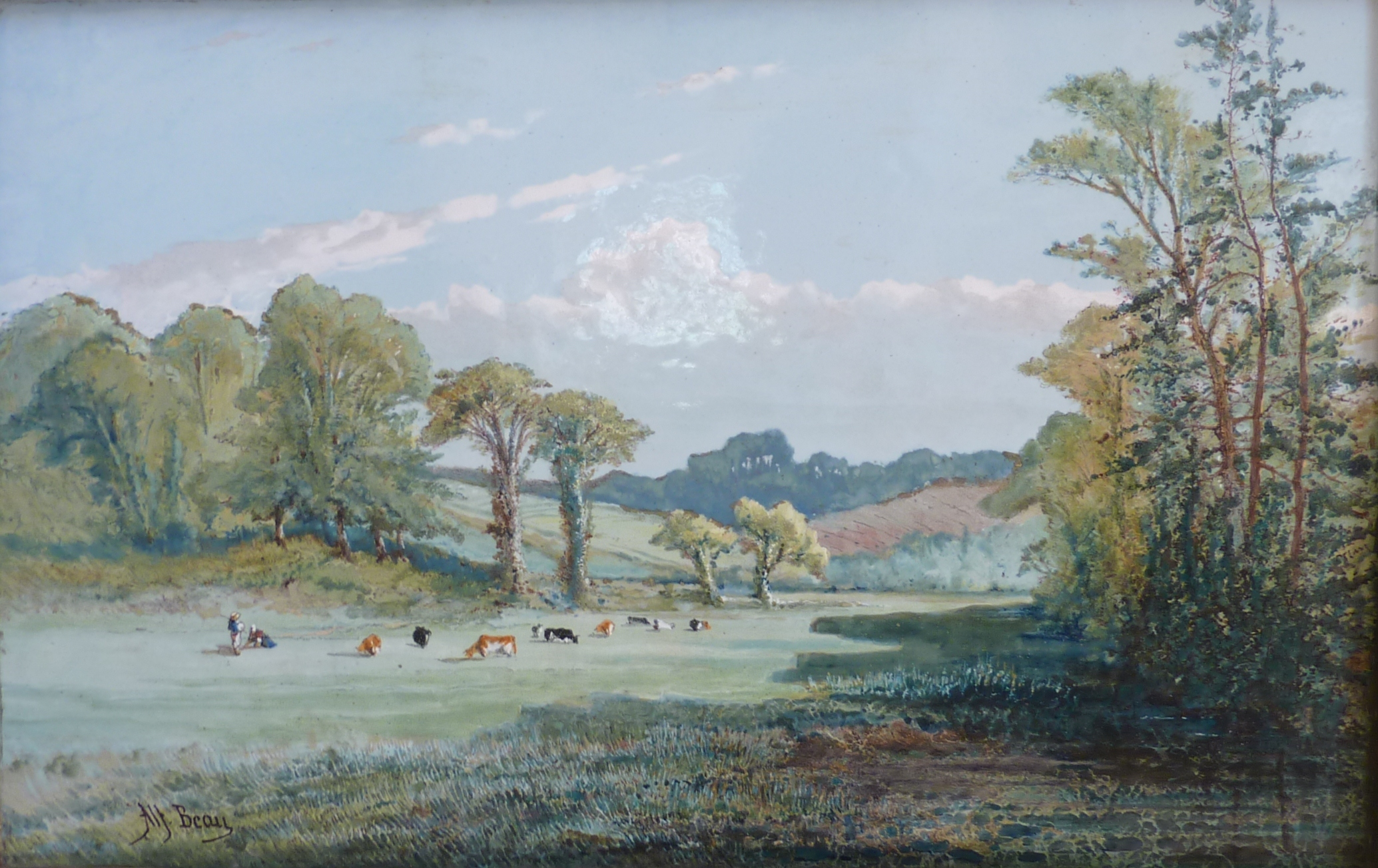
Marais de Pluguffan, a painting on enamel manufactured by Porquier and held in the Manoir de Kerazan, foundation Astor.

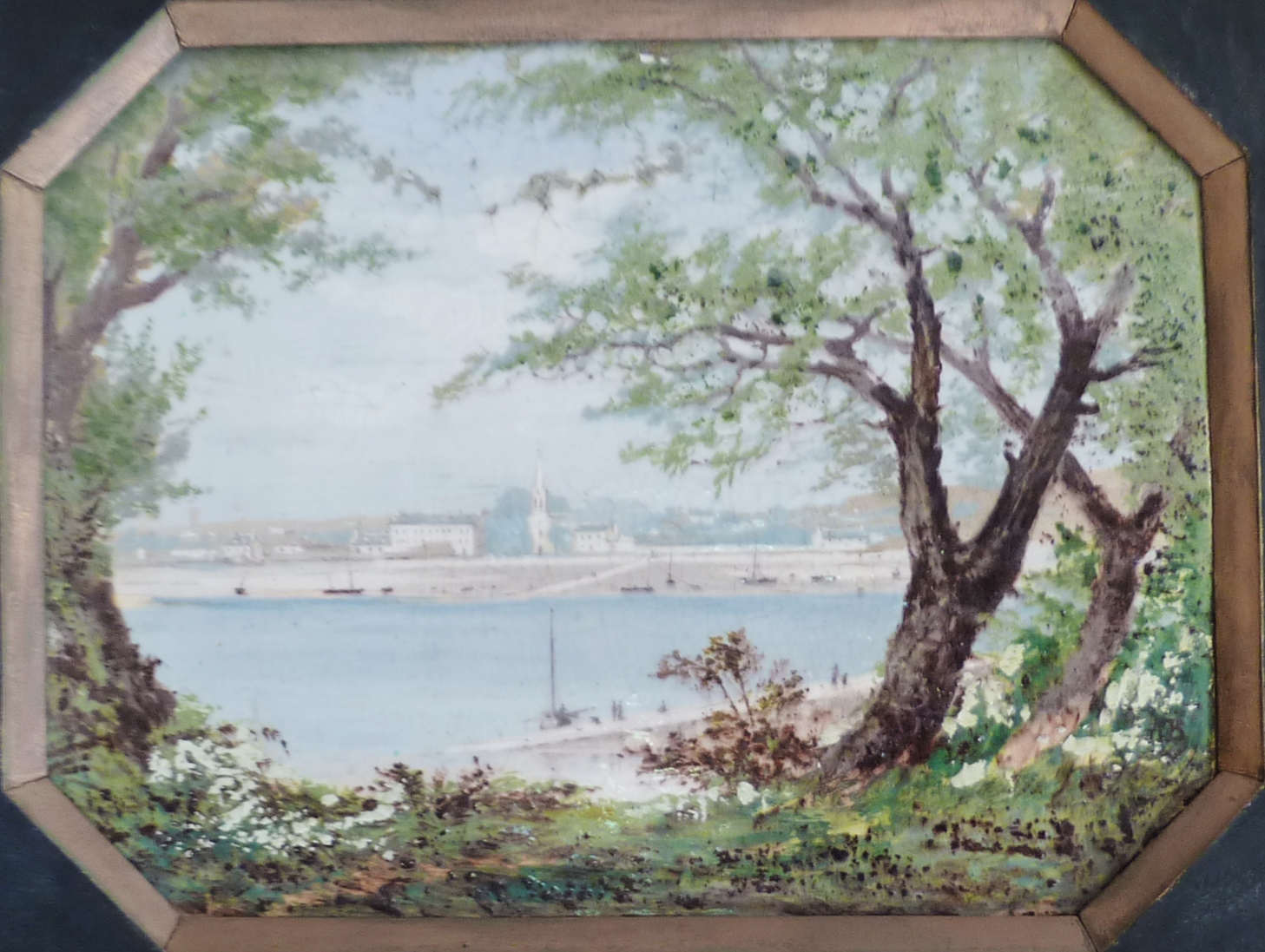
Bénodet vu de Sainte-Marine. This painting on enamel was made by Porquier and is held in the Manoir de Kerazan, foundation Astor.

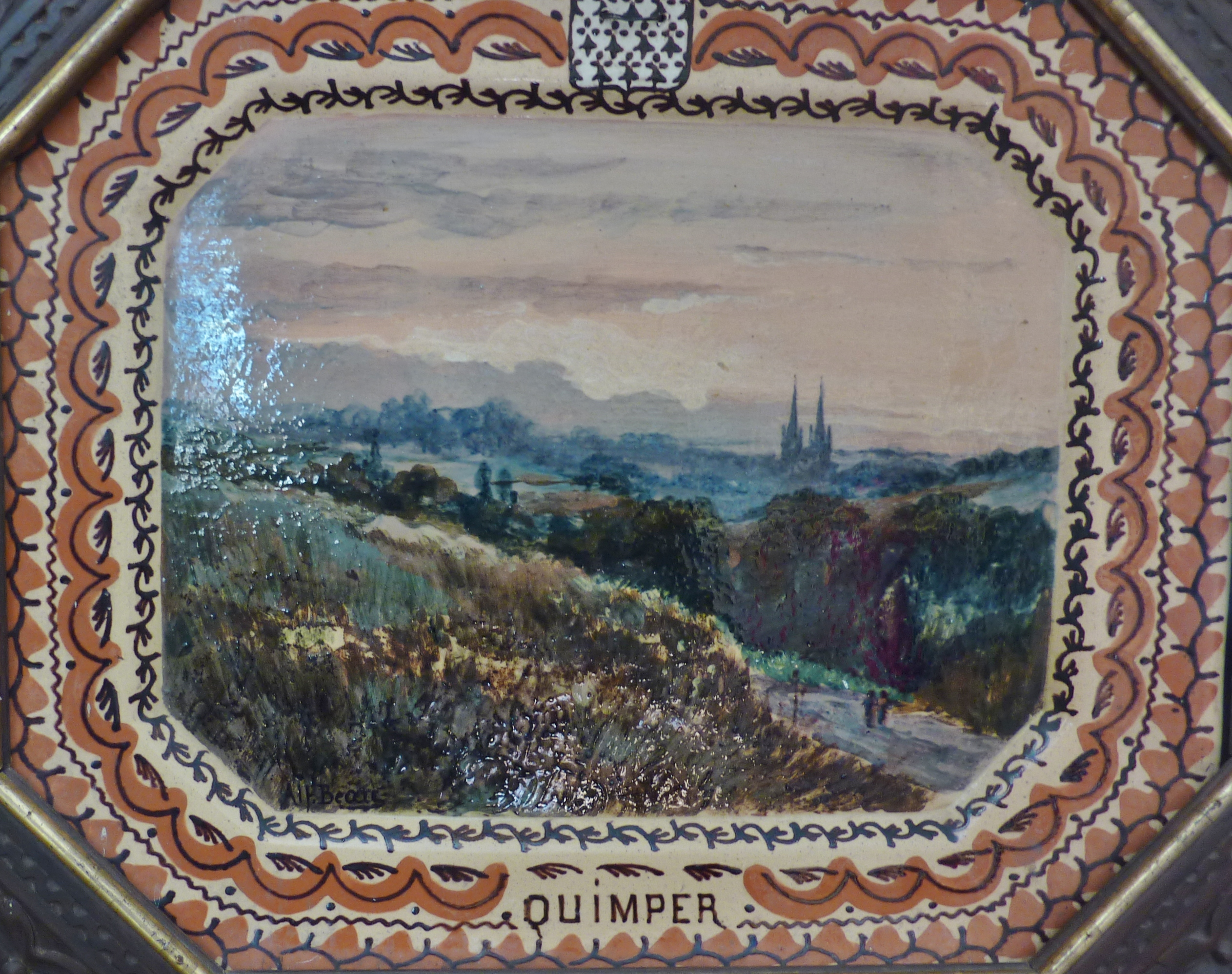
Lever du jour à Quimper. A terracotta work made by Porquier and held in the Manoir de Kerazan, foundation Astor.

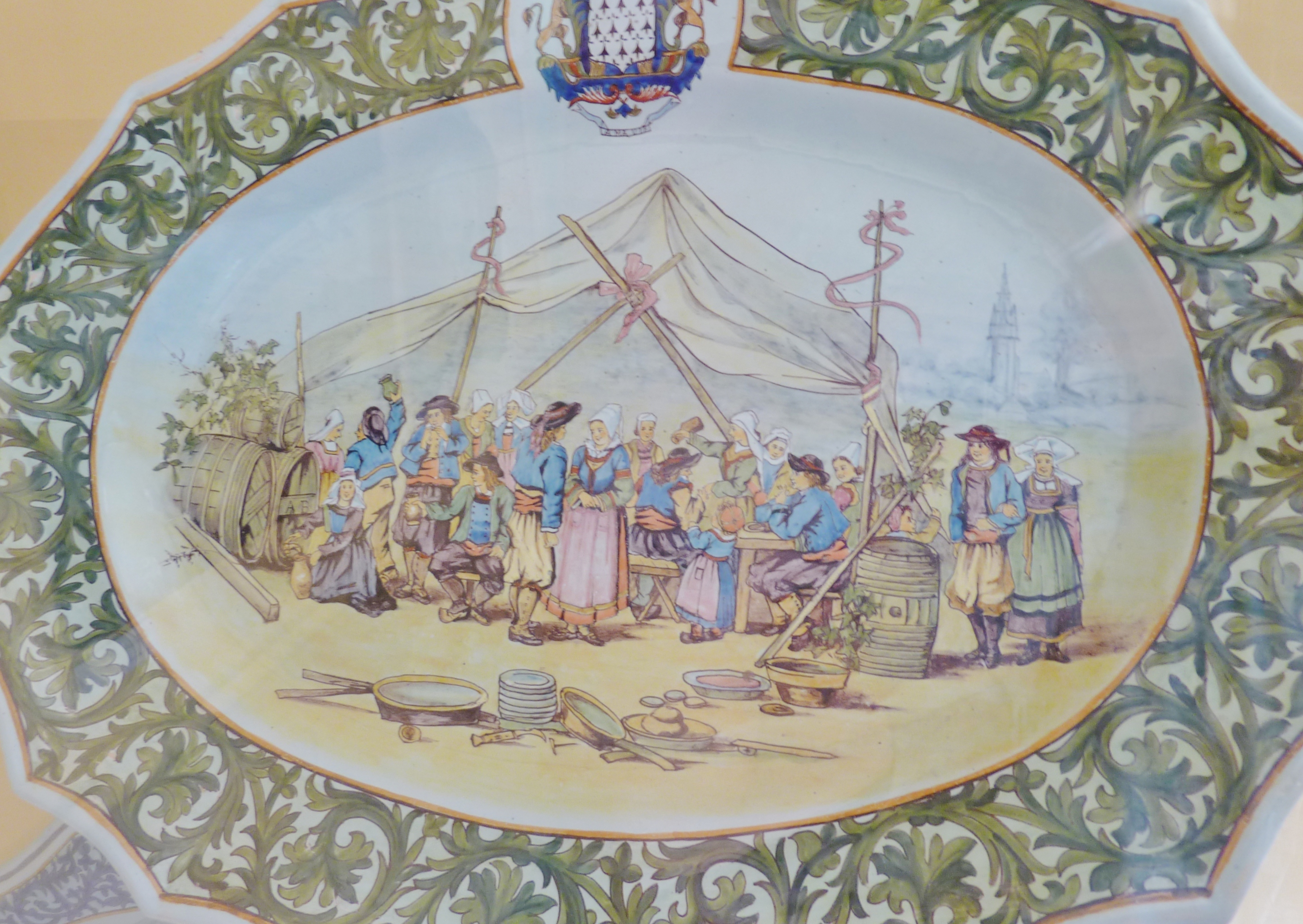
Plat avec décor de noce bretonne. A plate held in the collection of the Manoir de Kerazan, foundation Astor.

== His tomb ==
Alfred Beau is buried in Quimper's Cimetière Saint-Marc. His tomb is decorated with a relief depicting an artist's palette and a medallion of Beau by the sculptor Hector Lemaire.
