= Dominique Roman =

French photographer (1824–1911)

Dominique Roman (April 16, 1824 – 1911) was a French photographer from Arles.
