= Benedicte Van der Maar =

French photographer and artist

Bénédicte Van der Maar (born in 1968) is a French photographer and artist.

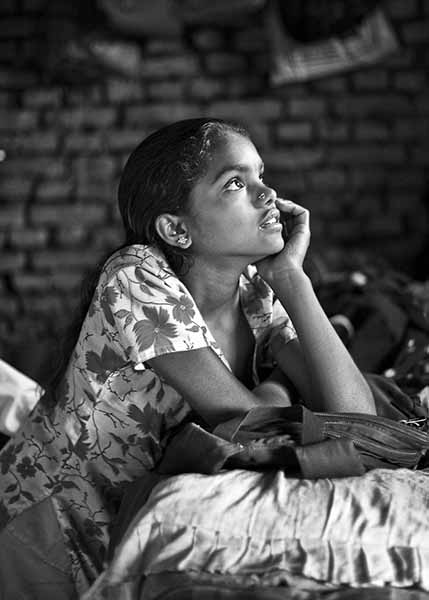
The Dreamer

== Biography ==
Van der Maar was born in Paris. She entered the world of studio photography as an assistant of the photographer Jean-Loup Sieff. She then made portraits of friends, actors and dancers, which were exhibited in the city of Montrouge. She photographed in New York, Italy, Israel and India. Her "Accumulations" were noticed by "La Galerie Le Simoun" which exhibited her work in Paris in 2007. In 2008, the daily paper France-Soir published one of her photos titled The New Yorker. Her series of conceptual photography Fragile was shown at the la Nuit de la Photographie Contemporaine exhibition in Paris.

In 2010, Van der Maar's work was shown by Pierre Cornette de Saint-Cyr at a French contemporary art auction.

She travelled to Haiti to photograph the daily battles at Sun City. "Les Enfants du Cholera" was broadcast by Doctors Without Borders.

In 2011 Van der Maar followed the "Little Buddha" in the jungle of Nepal. Her photo essay was published as a spread in Paris Match.

== Work ==
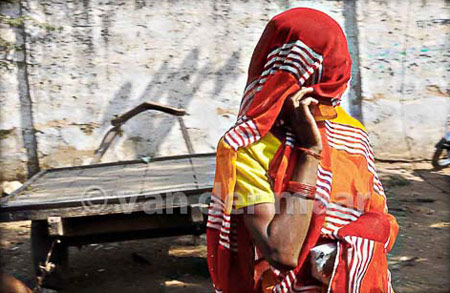
Van der Maar, Hidden, 2007

Van der Maar's work is a reflection on women's role in society, as seen from different cultures. "In her photography she occupies herself with the human beeing [sic] in the different regions of the world. [...] With her works Bénédicte van der Maar is a strong position in the new contemporary figurative and social french photography." writes German curator Martin Leyer-Pritzkow.

Van der Maar focuses on fragility, on human topics. In her portraits, she depicts social, economic and cultural issues, she also exposes discrimination, like the exploitation and slavery of women and children.

"I'm interested in Human rights, particularly in Women's rights. Women are strong but their status is fragile. We can verify that everywhere. The man's vision is different in every culture, philosophy or religion, so the woman's existence is different every time. That's why she is fragile, because she lives "according to...". Fashion and advertising always portray a sublime idea of women, we never get to see the everyday life. That is my subject" explains the photographer in an interview for the exhibition "The Woman" in Versus & Versus Gallery, 2014.

== Exhibitions ==
- 2007 What Else, solo show, Galerie La Simoun, Paris, France.
- 2009 Ils exposent pour la vie, group show, City Hall, Paris, France.
- 2010 Fragile sculpture, group show, Galerie Maubert, Paris, France.
- 2015 Good Earth, group show for the COP21 and GoodPlanet Foundation, Earth Gallery, Paris.
