= Pascal Meunier (photographer) =

French photographer and photojournalist

Pascal Meunier (born 1966) is a French documentary photographer and photojournalist based in Paris, whose works are mainly about the Arab and Muslim world. He began his professional career in Aleppo, Syria. For nine years, he has reported on cultural traditions in many different countries that include but are not limited to Mauritania, Malaysia, Yemen, Iran, Libya, and Egypt.

His focuses are on culture and tradition — from the oasis of Cairo to the gardens of the Sahara and beyond — rather than things of a political nature.

Meunier is a regular contributor to publications including Le Monde 2, L'Espresso, Geo, Newsweek, and Eight. He has published two books about oriental steam baths or hammams, ("Hammams" in 2005); the newer is "The Last Hammams of Cairo. A Disappearing bathhouse Culture" (ed. American University in Cairo, 2009).
