= Natalia Turine =

Natalia Turine is a well-known Russian journalist and photographer.

== Biography ==
Natalia Turine (born 16 February 1964 in Germany) is a Russian journalist who currently lives and works in Paris, France. Since 2003, her main activity has been photography which, in video format, is frequently accompanied by narration. This latter mode of expression Turine defines in one word: “Short-photography” – a term referring to the symbolic of the short film genre within cinema.

The daughter of a diplomat, Turine lived in France from 1973 to 1980. At the age of sixteen, she returned to Moscow, where she graduated from the Foreign Languages Institute (FLI).

== Career ==
=== Russian Period ===
In 1987, Turine joined Gosteleradio, the first Russian television channel. Together with Mikael Makarenkov, she created Express Kamera, a Russian society television program.

In 1995, Turine became artistic director of the Russian television channel RTR. From 1999 to 2001, she was vice-president of the Russian Culture Foundation, of which the cineaste Nikita Mikhalkov was president.

In addition to her work in television, Turine pursued journalism and began to write provocative articles and then novels such as The Singing Bird, which was published in the Russian edition of Citizen K. Turine is also a regular contributor to the Russian literary magazine, SNOB.SNOB Both magazines have published her photographic work.

In 2013, Turine participated in the writing of 12 Months, an anthology collecting eleven other renowned writers including Limonov, Petrushevskaya, Tolstaïa, Granine, and Prilepine.

=== French Period ===
In 1990, Natalia Turine was invited by the television channel France 2 for a carte blanche, to participate in the television news program Regard, which aired daily at 8 pm.

From 1991 to 1994, Turine ‘ran a column’ in Télé Zèbre (presented by Thierry Ardisson) and then in Coucou c’est nous !, another televised program. In 1991, with Patrick Le Lay and the participation of TF1, Tourine launched a project for creating the first private television channel in the former USSR.

From 1992 to 1994, she authored and presented the program Paristroika Paristroika, on MCM. In 1994, she became the presenter for Macadam Music on FR3.

In 2013, Natalia Turine was invited to display her photographic work at the PHOTO OFF exhibition in Paris.

In 2015, based upon an idea by Natalia Turine and Sergueï Nicolaïevitch, an anthology of 18 Russian writers entitled NOSTALGIA : La mélancolie du futur was published by Éditions Daphnis et Chloé, featuring a preface by Mazarine Pingeot. In connection with this release, Turine was invited to appear on Bibliothèque Médicis of 24 April 2015.

Link to a representative example of Turine's "short-photography" : http://www.nataliaturine.com/video.html

Link to Bibliothèque Médicis of 24 April 2015 : https://www.youtube.com/watch?v=HfpGsoPmZY0
