= Louis-Camille d'Olivier =

French photographer

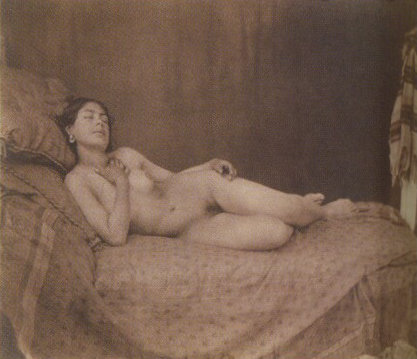
Nu Allonge, etude

Louis-Camille d'Olivier (1827–1873) was a French photographer. Born in Châlons-en-Champagne, d'Olivier worked and died in Paris, France

The pose of d'Olivier's Nu Allonge, etude was used by Richard Hamilton in his last, unfinished work, based upon Balzac's Le Chef-d'œuvre inconnu, and first exhibited in three parts known as "Balzac a, b, and c" (2011-2012) in The National Gallery, October 2012.
