= Antoine Tempé =

French photographer

Antoine Tempé is a French photographer who has made work in New York City, West Africa and France. He is mostly known for his studio shots of African dancers and for his portraits of African artists and intellectuals.

In 2008, he published the book Afrique, Danse Contemporaine with the choreographer Salia Sanou.

== Life and work ==
Tempé studied business in France and moved to New York City to work in the financial field in 1984. He also continued training as a dancer. He began his work as an amateur photographer in 1989, but by 1991 was spending about half his time working in photography. He became a full-time photographer in 2000.

His images, in the form of large, carefully executed, black-and-white prints that often measure up to 4 feet in height, have been exhibited in Europe, the U.S. and Africa. His work has been featured in magazines such as Photo Magazine, Le Monde 2 and Libération, among others.

== Publication ==
- Afrique, Danse Contemporaine. Paris: Cercle d'art; Centre National de la Danse, 2008. With Salia Sanou. ISBN 978-2-7022-0886-1.
