= Laurent Benaïm =

French photographer

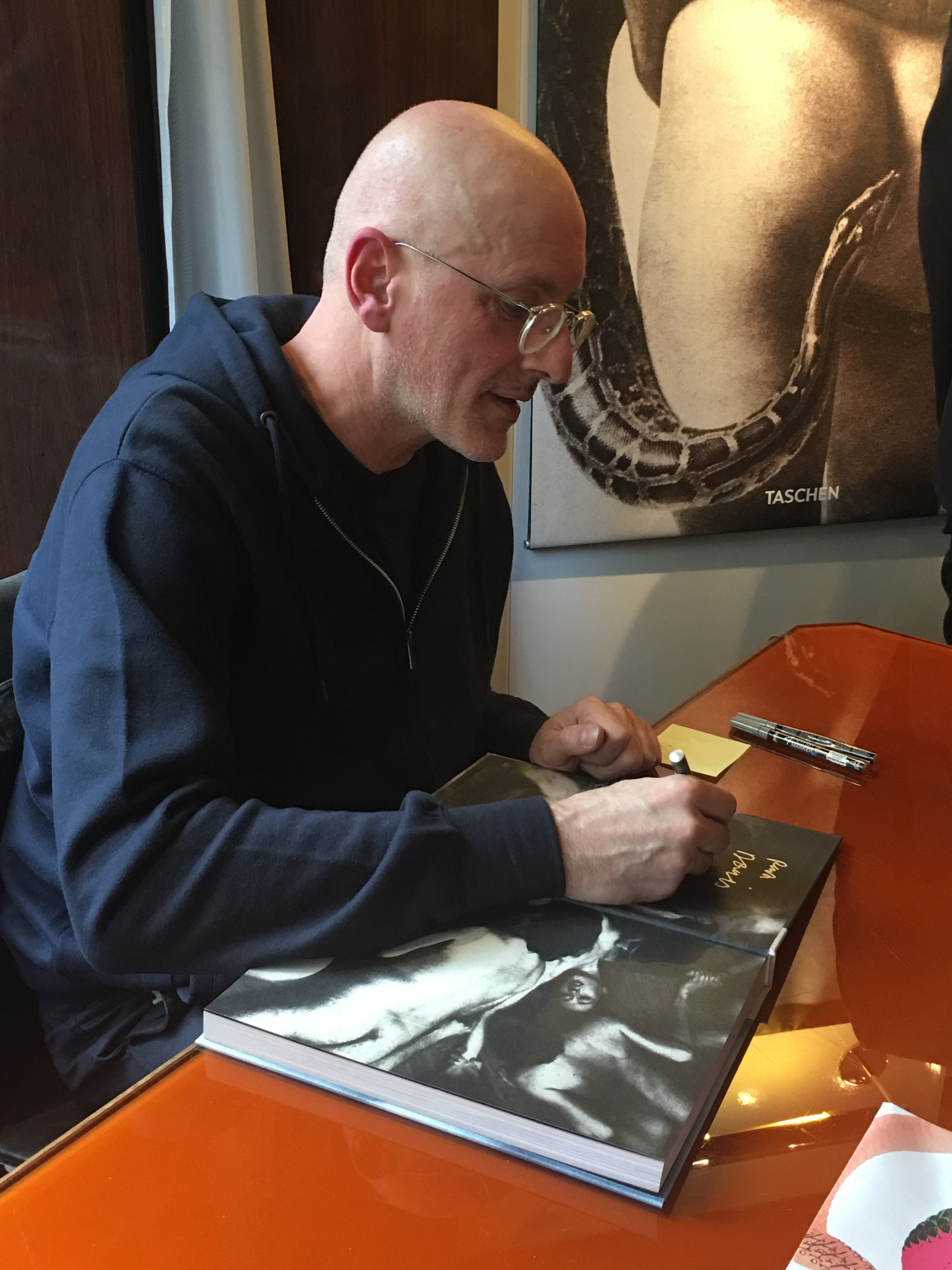
- Born: August 24, 1965 (age 60); 8th arrondissement of Paris, France
- Status: Active
- Occupation: Photographer
- Website: https://laurentbenaim.fr/

Laurent Benaïm (born August 24, 1965) is a French photographer specializing in the erotic photography of amateur models, developing his work using the Victorian gum bichromate printing process.

== Life and studies ==
Laurent Benaïm was born in the 8th arrondissement of Paris, France. Both his parents worked within the television milieu; his father as a key set decorator, his mother as a make-up artist.

Benaïm studied photography for two years in 1982, attending EFET in Paris. Once his studies were over in 1985, he entered the French Air Force, working as a photographer in Africa for two years. He returned to France and started to work as a freelance photographer for advertising companies such as Cato Johnson.

Benaïm started to work with the French company Lefevre in 1990, taking pictures of historical monuments. He continues to work for the company today.

=== Work ===
Benaïm shot his first nude pictures at the age of 22 during his first erotic photography project.

During the Gulf War, budget restrictions across all industries began limiting his commercial work in advertising, and he decided to dedicate his time to erotic photography exclusively.

He discovered gum bichromate printing through his search for premises to work in. During a visit, a huge print displayed inside the room caught his attention and drove him to research the process at his local library. Working from a book published in 1850, he developed his first gum bichromate picture in a soup plate at his home. He immediately fell in love with the technique, which he said rendered pictures more theatrical and removed any temporal notions. Benaïm has continued to use the printing technique until today, with lighting becoming one of his main points of focus. His work consists mostly of dimly-lit shots, yet using diffused light to bring the subject to the fore. He has been linked to influences Man Ray and Patrick Faigenbaum. He prefers to work with black and white photography to explore the use of contrast.

During his first erotic shoots, Benaïm shot real couples and gave them free rein, aiming to give as little direction as possible. Recently, his shoots are carefully prepared and have become more elaborate, shooting up to 30 models at once and sometimes recruiting volunteers from all corners of France to help carry out his vision. Over time, he garnered a following through word-of-mouth, as well as through Tumblr and Fetlife, particularly in the United States. Shoots participants have become increasingly "kinky", and his photographic work gradually evolved into a means to explore diverse and unusual sexualities and represent "all silhouettes, genders and fantasies."

Although he actively seeks to represent unusual sexual tendencies, Benaïm does not identify as an activist, but rather has expressed his desire for his work to elicit a reaction from its viewers. He does not pass judgment on the sexual fantasies brought to him by his models, finding them to be "representative of the men and women leading active, social lives who find balance by, for example, wearing costumes during BDSM sessions."

Benaïm's work has been published in six different publications, three of which were edited by Atelier du Chat Soleil, a publishing house which he set up with his friends.

In 2016, Benaïm was included in Vice's 'favorite pictures of 2016' list.

In 2019, he collaborates with Dian Hanson and publish 300 of his finest pictures, edited by Taschen.

== Exhibitions ==
- 2008: Museum of Eroticism, Paris, France
- 2011: The Shape of Us, Kinsey Institute, Indiana University, United States
- 2016: Laurent Benaïm: Sur Moi, Voies Off, Rencontres d'Arles, Arles, France

== Publications ==
- Corpus Delicti. Atelier du Chat-Soleil, 2002.
- Lunacy Things. Atelier du Chat-Soleil, 2008.
- Chaires amies. Atelier du Chat-Soleil, 2011.
- Faire l'amour. Taschen, 2019.
