= Christine Spengler =

French war photographer (born 1945)

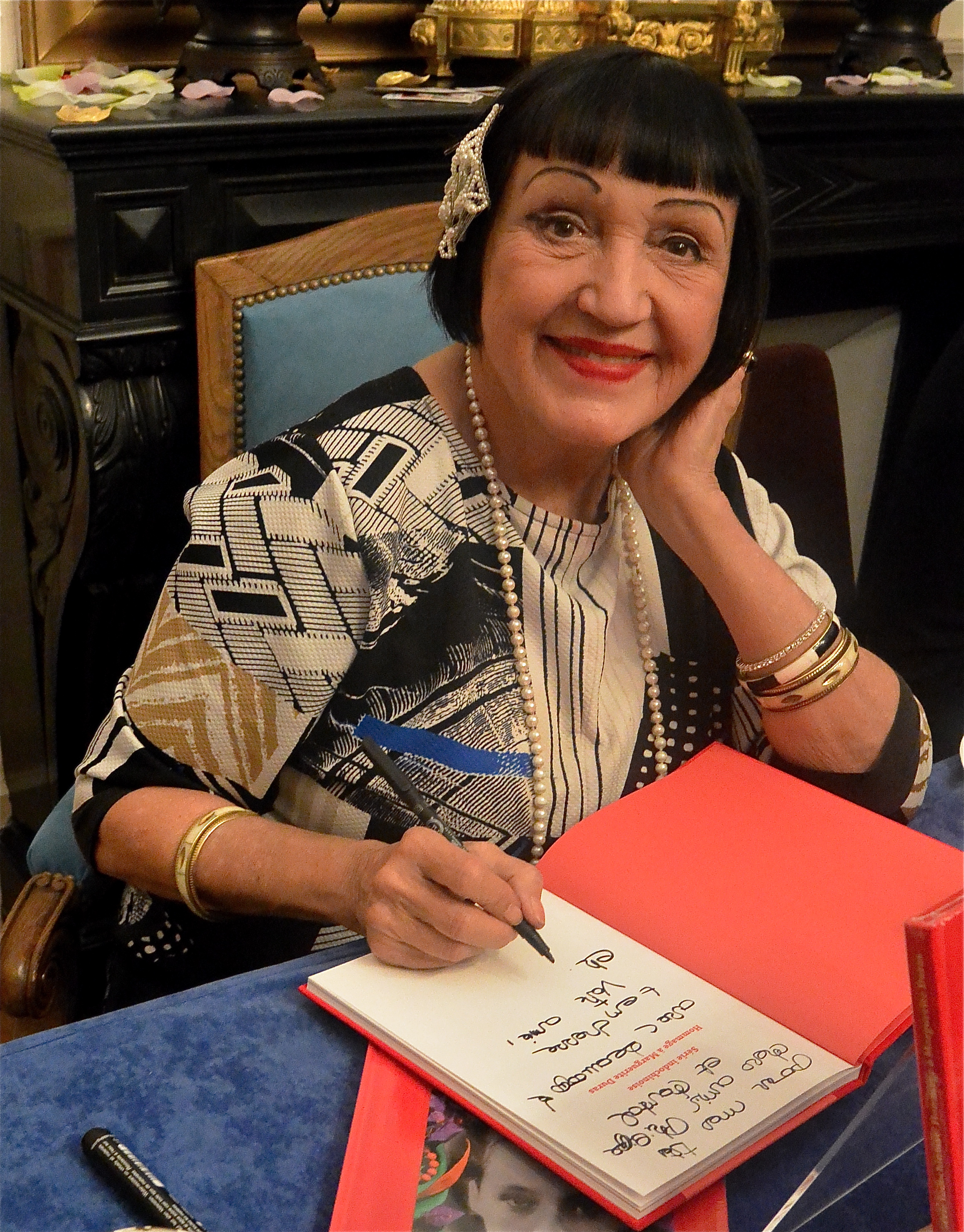
- Christine Spengler in 2017
- Born: 1945; Alsace, France
- Occupation: Photographer, photojournalist
- Years active: 1970 – present
- Awards: Chevalier of the Legion of Honour (2009); Chevalier des Arts et des Lettres (2006); Prix Roger-Pic (SCAM) (1998)
- Website: www.christinespengler.com

Christine Spengler (born 1945) is a French war photographer. Since 1970, she has photographed and reported on wars and conflicts in various countries, primarily from the point of view of the victims of war.

She worked freelance as a photographer for Sipa-Press, Corbis-Sygma, and Associated Press, while she documented wars in Chad, Northern Ireland, Vietnam, Cambodia, Lebanon, Western Sahara, Kurdistan, Nicaragua, Kosovo, Afghanistan, and Iraq. Her black-and-white photographs have appeared in major news media, including Paris-Match, Time, Newsweek, El País, The New York Times, and Le Monde. In fashion photography, she photographed the Christian Dior winter 2018/2019 ready-to-wear Collection.

== Life and career ==
Born in Alsace, France, Spengler moved to Madrid, Spain, at the age of seven after her parents' divorce. Living with her aunt and uncle, she studied French and Spanish literature with the intention to become a writer.

=== Early years ===
At the age of 23, Spengler and her younger brother Eric left Madrid. While travelling through Chad during the Toubou Wars, Spengler borrowed her brother's camera and photographed soldiers headed into battle. For taking the picture, Spengler and her brother were arrested and held for 23 days in prison on speculation they were spies or journalists. Despite the arrest, Spengler continued to focus on war photography, specifically on the adapted daily life of women and children in cities targeted by bombs and the consequences that followed after war.

=== The Nylon magazine ===
Spengler then began to work for The Nylon magazine, photographing war and protests in Northern Ireland. Spengler photographed children and other civilians of the war. She would immerse herself in the culture, as she put on a veil in the 1979 Iranian Revolution, to capture intimate shots of her subjects.

=== Sipa Press and Life magazine ===
Later, Spengler worked with Sipa Press on an assignment in Bangladesh to photograph a Pakistan leader returning home after nine years as a captive. As she befriended the leader's wife, she was invited to a private gathering, unopened to the press. Life magazine signed a contract with her on the spot, where they published many of her works.

=== Associated Press and Vietnam ===
After working with Life, she worked with Associated Press during the Vietnam War where she photographed the front lines. She stayed several months in Vietnam before receiving news of her brother Eric's suicide. She went on to document many other wars, from a civilian's perspective, gaining worldwide attention for a perspective few war photographers take. Commenting on her shooting images of women in Iran during the 1979 Islamic revolution, she said "I had access to a whole world of women, to which no man could have access."

=== Other subjects ===
Spengler once worked for the fashion world, when Maria Grazia Chuiri, Dior's first female creative director, asked her to shoot the backstage images for the fashion brand's AW18 collection. For this, Spengler recreated the 1968 student protests with models marching like an army. Further, she published photographs from Spain in the photo book Vierges et toreros (lit. Virgins and Toreros) and another one on the Spanish islands Ibiza and Formentera. In 2017, her book of images from the former French colony Indochina was published along with writings by Marguerite Duras.

== Awards and recognition ==
Spengler, who has called herself a "war correspondent, visual artist and writer" and has never worn a helmet or a bullet proof vest while working, has won several prizes for her work. In particular, she was awarded the 1998 SCAM Prize (Paris) for her reports on women in war and the Femme de l'Année (Woman of the Year) Prize in Brussels in 2002.

In 2006, Spengler was awarded the French Ordre des Arts et des Lettres and in 2009, she was decorated as Chevalier of the Legion of Honor, the highest and most prestigious French order of merit.

== Publications ==
- Une femme dans la guerre, éditions Ramsay, 1991.
- Vierges et toreros, éditions Marval, 2003
- Années de guerre, éditions Marval, 2003.
- Une femme dans la guerre: 1970-2005, Des femmes. Antoinette Fouque, 2006.
- Ibiza y Formentera eternas. La serenidad recobrada, Camara de Commercio, Ibiza y Formentera, 2009.
- L'Opéra du monde, Cherche midi, 2016. (Catalog of an exhibition held at Maison européenne de la photographie, 6 April – 5 June 2016)
- Série indochinoise, hommage à Marguerite Duras, Cherche midi, 2017.

== Reception ==
Writing for LensCulture, Jim Casper said: "Her photos rarely show bloody wounds, violent skirmishes or dead bodies. Instead we discover people attempting to have some sort of ordinary life in the vast, empty smoking ravages of bombed-out landscapes."

Among many other shows, Spengler had a major one-person retrospective exhibition in 2003 at Visa pour l'Image in Perpignan, France. In 2022, the Musée de la liberation de Paris presented a group exhibition of eight notable woman war photographers. This show included Lee Miller, Gerda Taro, Catherine Leroy, Christine Spengler, Françoise Demulder, Susan Meiselas, Carolyn Cole and Anja Niedringhaus. Covering seventy-five years of international conflicts between 1936 and 2011, it documented women's involvement in conflicts, whether as fighters, victims, or witnesses. In 2024, fifty years after she had documented the bombing of Phnom Penh by the Khmer Rouge, Spengler had a retrospective exhibition at Sosoro Museum as part of the Phnom Penh Photo Festival 2024.

The 2022 documentary film Les Guerres de Christine S., directed by Philippe Vallois, includes interviews and photographs from Spengler's career.
