= Kate Polin =

French photographer (born 1967)

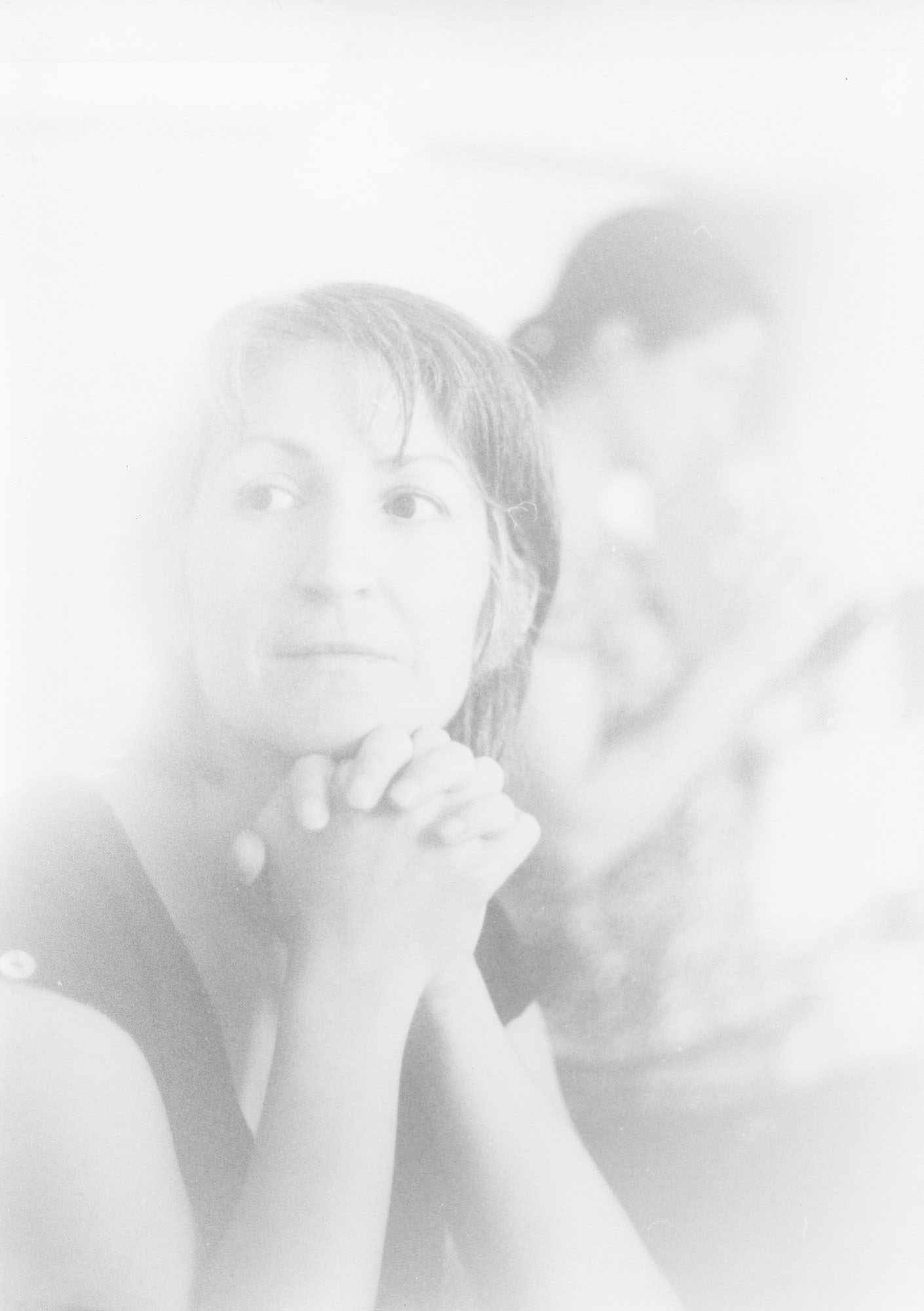
- Kate Polin, 2011.
- Born: Catherine Paulin; 10 June 1967 (age 58); Le Petit-Quevilly, Upper Normandy, France
- Known for: Photographer
- Website: http://www.katepolin.com

Kate Polin (born June 10, 1967) is a French photographer.

== Awards ==
- 2011 - First prize of FNAC contest, France.

== Exhibitions ==
- 2011 - Printemps des poètes festival, exposition, Rouen, France.
- 2010 - Estrapade, exposition, Paris, France.
- 2009 - Gallery MAMA, exposition, Rouen, France.
- 2008 - Buquet, exposition, Elbeuf, France.
- 2008 - Zero, exposition, Rouen, France.

== Gallery ==
- 2011 - Gallery Millennium Images, London, England.
- 2008 - Art confrontations Gallery, Rouen, France.

== Workshops ==
- 2011 - Workshop with Serge Picard, Arles, France.
- 2008 - Workshop with Antoine D'Agata, Arles, France.
