= Yohann Gozard =

French fine-art photographer (born 1977)

Yohann Gozard (born 1977 in Montluçon, France) is a French fine-art photographer. Most of its photographs are landscapes caught in long or very long exposure from the darkest prints of its "Lumière noire" series to the brightest pictures, as some of the "Wonderpools" series.

Yohann Gozard has mostly showed its work in France but also in Belgium, Germany, Russia and Spain. After he lived and worked in Toulouse from 1996 to 2018, he is currently living in Sète. He teach photography at École supérieure des beaux-arts de Montpellier (MO.CO. Esba), from MO.CO. (Montpellier Contemporain), Montpellier.

== Selected exhibitions ==
=== Solo ===
- 2016 "Have blue", Galerie Vasistas, Montpellier, France.
- 2015 "Le paradoxe de la nuit noire", Galerie du Château d'eau, Toulouse, France.
- 2014 "Chronotope", Maison Salvan, Labège, France.
- 2009 "Lumière noire", Galerías Spectrum Sotos, Zaragoza, Spain.
- 2008 "Pauses" and "Wonderpools", Galerie Dix9, Paris, France.
- 2006 "Pauses", Galerie du Château d'Eau, Toulouse.

=== Group ===
- 2020 "(Hinterland)", Centre d'art et de photographie de Lectoure,, Lectoure, France
- 2014 "(Phosphene)", Pleonasm, Brussels, Belgium.
- 2013 "Ressources poétiques", Musée des Abattoirs, Toulouse.
- 2010 "In the night", Proekt_Fabrika, Moscow House of Photography, Moscow, Russia.
- 2009 "(sur)impression", Atelier Am Eck, Düsseldorf, Germany.
