= Chloé Tallot =

French contemporary artist (born 1973)

- Born: 1973 (age 52–53); Neuilly-sur-Seine, France
- Education: École nationale supérieure des arts décoratifs Lycée Pasteur; Sorbonne University
- Occupation: Artist

Chloé Tallot (born 1973) is a French contemporary artist whose medium is video, photography, drawings and installation.

== Early life and education ==
Tallot was born in Neuilly-sur-Seine, France in 1973. Between 1975 and 1991 she lived in Rabat, Morocco. She studied philosophy and literature at the Sorbonne between 1993 and 1995. She then studied at École nationale supérieure des arts décoratifs between 1995 and 1999.

== Works ==
=== Solo Show ===
Year	Show	Location
2001	25 Peintures	Atelier La Main d'Or, Paris
2003	Sentimentale	Simone Gallery, Paris
2004	Animale & Sentimentale	To b art gallery, Saint Barthélemy, Caribbean
2006	Sentimentale = Animale	Issy-les-Moulineaux, France
2006	Ragazze	To b art gallery, Saint Barthélemy, Caribbean
2008	Animale & Sentimentale	Constantine, Algeria

=== Group Show ===
Year	Show	Location
2003	Animale (curator: Valentine De Badereau)	Espace Beaurepaire, Paris
2006	Le Minotaure	Galerie du Port Autonome, Paris
2007	Regard sur l'Enfance	Galerie Bailly Contemporain, Paris
2007	Premiers Choix	Galerie Bailly Contemporain, Paris
2007	Video Show (curator: Carine Le Mallet)	Galerie Magda Danysz, Paris
2007	Rendez-vous à Saint Barthélémy	Galerie To b art, Saint Barthélemy, Caribbean
2008	Galerie Bailly contemporain	Paris
2008	Make extraordinary what is ordinary	Fantoni Studio, Milan
2008	Under my Skin (curator: Carine Le Mallet)	Galerie Magda Danysz, Paris
2009	Faces	Galerie fr:Magda Danysz, Shanghai, China
2009	Galerie Bailly contemporain	Art Photo Expo, Miami
2010	Trois jeunes artistes	Galerie Valentine de Badereau, Saint Barthélemy, Caribbean

=== Festival and performance ===
Year	Event	Location
1999	Pas de Temps	Flèche d'or, Paris
1999	Partie de Pêche	Sevilla Festival, Seville
2000	Silence dans le fortin	Canal+, Algeria
2006	11	Stedelijk Museum, Amsterdam
2006	Liquid Architecture	Paris-Paris, Paris
2007	Darwin Made Me	Vidéobank, Clermont-Ferrand
2007	Share	Reboot'bar, New York
2008	La Blanchisserie	Boulogne, France
2008	Paris est une fête (curator: Magda Danysz)	Palais Galliera, Paris
2008	11	Stedelijk Museum, Amsterdam
2009	Arte Video Night (curators: Dominique Goutard, Alain Fleischer, Jean-Luc Monterosso)	Arte, Centre Pompidou, Paris
2009	Mapping Festival	Geneva, Switzerland
2009	Festival Vision'R	Paris
2009	Laptops R us	Video Ring, Paris
2010	Mapping Festival 2010	MAD, Geneva

=== Residences ===
Year	Venue	Location
2005	To b art Gallery	Saint Barthélemy, Caribbean
2008	French Cultural Centre	Constantine, Algeria
2009	Magda Danysz	Shanghai, China
2010	French Cultural Centre	Bandung, Indonesia

=== Publications ===
2001

- Elle, Carnets de voyages, November, p. 72
- Young Talent Photo, by Natalie Rodriguez

2002

- Les plus beaux carnets de voyages] Le Monde 2, July, No.20, p. 81
- Dreaming with opened eyes Libération, 6 June
- Lâcher l'idée fixe de la différence des sexes Libération, 22 December, p. 47

2003

- Libération, Freud traduit en justesse, 31 January
- Le Minotaure, Si on pouvait changer de vie, p. 56–57
- Le Minotaure, The Gallery, p. 12–13, Les Beaux Arts sous Apple, No.2, p. 146–147
- Le Minotaure, L'idiotie, Philosophy, October 2003, No.1, p. 70–75
- Black & White, Sex, Black+White Books
- Calmann-Lévy, book, Thinking racism, cover

2004

- Tropical, Saint Barthélemy, Chloé Tallot, by Suzanne Aubin, 2004–2005, p. 128–136

2005

- Icon, Chloé Tallot, by Marie Lefort, May, p. 274–279

2006

- "Organs and feelings" Le Monde 2, Michel Philippot, 9 December, p. 13
- Enville, The Animal part, Caroline Bourrus, No.19, p. 44–49
- De l'air, Was ist Freud ? August, No.26, p. 30

2007

- Pure, Saint Barthélemy, Glowing Table, To b art, No.4 issue
- L'Officiel, Regard sur l'Enfance, November–January.
- Cimaise, Quai Voltaire, September–November
- Gallery Guide Europe, Mur Animal, September, p. 26
- Exporama, Regard sur l'Enfance, October, No.6
- "Onirisme" Etapes, by Laetitia Sellam, April, No.143, p. 25–26
- "French Connexion after Armory Show" Blast, Spring, No.24, p. 141–142

2009

- "Chloé Tallot, Arts" WAD, No.40, March, p. 243
- "The advent of dualism" Philosophy magazine, No.31, July, p. 45
- "A paradoxical freedom" Philosophy magazine, No.24, March, p. 36–37

=== Commissioned ===
2001

- Carte Blanche, Metropole Sofitel, Hanoi, Vietnam

2002

- Temptation Guide Libération, 6 December, p. 31/32

2003

- Harper's Bazaar Russia, Xenia Gorbatcheva, Hôtel Crillon, December

2007

- Ultra rich Le Monde 2, cover and p. 27–30, December, No.200

2008

- Neurons Le Monde 2, August, p. 10–15
- Amy Bloom Transfuge, October, No.23, p. 31

2009

- Roland Garros (French Open), prestige book, Carte de Blanche, 16 pages, Paris
- Neurosciences Le Monde 2, March, p. 18–21

=== Works ===
1997

- Partie de Pêche, video, color, 4 min.
- Coup-les, with Sophie Fougère, Super 8, color, 3 min.
- Parking, video, black and white, 4 min.
- Le journal de 13h, co-realized with Pierrot Dunan, video, color, 3 min.
- Petite histoire, written by Sandra Matamoros, video, color, 2 min.
- Bonnie & Clyde, animation video, color, 1 min.
- La vie en Rose, sound track, 7 min, co-realized with Anri Sala.

1998

- Rêve & Réalité, Super 8, color, 20 min.
- A la recherche de…, drawings, texts and photographs about writer Philippe Sollers.

1999

- Voyages à l'Est, photographs, barite paper print, black and white.
- Pas de Temps, Super 8, color, 5mn.

1999–2010

- Carnets, work on everyday life, drawings, photographs, collages.

2000

- Silence dans le fortin, director of photography, video, 52 min, color, Algeria, by Éléonore Weber.
- 3'10 avant, Super 16, color, La Field Cie / Canal +

2001

- Trafiquante, photographic mix.
- 25 paintings, oil on canvas.

2002

- Autisme, photographic work on mental diseases and physical handicaps.

2002–2005

- Animale, photographs, dealing with violence in life and influenced by Darwin's scientific research.

2003

- Sentimentale, photographs and mix.

2003–2010

- Ceci est du verre, Ceci est une table, photographs printed on glass.

2004–2009

- Ragazze, installation, video, sound, sensors and photographs, cycle continue, 9 min.

2004–2010

- Femmes d'Intérieur, photographs, photo reel, sound, color.

2006

- Glowing Table, glass print, steel, design Matteo Fantoni.
- What-you-give-is-what-you-get, PDA video, color, Le Cube and Orange, 1 min.

2007

- Fragile, Sunbeam, installation, mobile composed of 11 branches, photographs, mirrors, resin, son.
- Wounded Flowers, video, color, co-realized with Arnout Hulskamp, 8 min.
- Mur animal, composition of 41 photographs, 7 panels, komacel, glass, wood, 325 × 215 cm.
- Organic, photo reel, sound, of the Animale series, color, 2 min.

2008

- Her Dance, video, composed of four girls portrait, black and white, 20 min or 14 min.

2009

- Aveugles, photographic mix, color.
- Sentimentale Trinity, photo reel, sound, presented as a triptych, 3 projections, cycle.

2010

- Nuances, video diptych, portrait of Jérôme Clément, Jérôme Clément, président of the European TV operator Arte, 2 projections.

=== Awards ===
1997

- Correspondences Indiennes, First Leica award.

1999

- Partie de Pêche, Canal+ award, Videoformes, Clermont-Ferrand, France
- Pas de Temps, Nanterre's short film award
