= Thomas Devaux =

French photographer

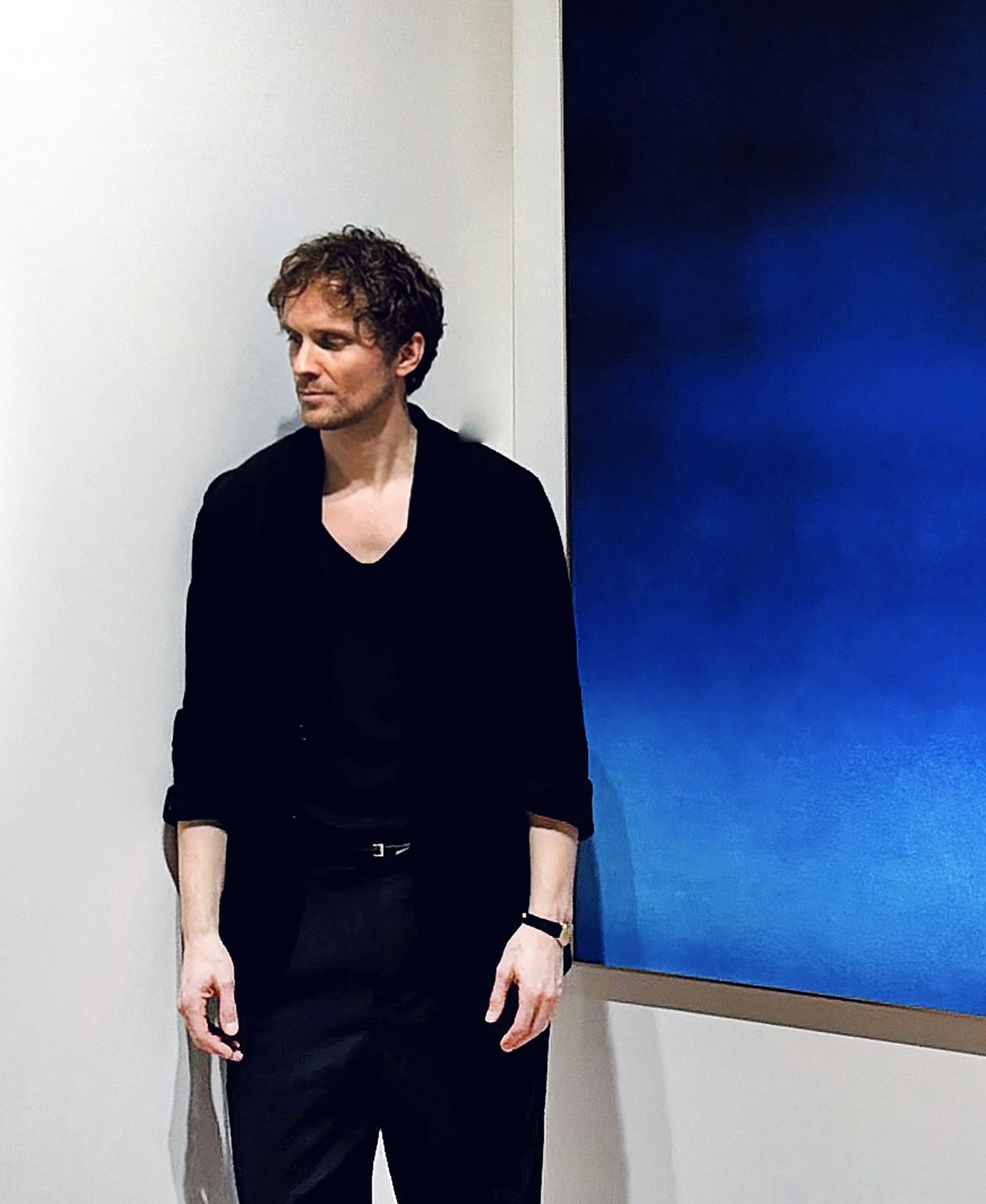
- Born: 1980 (age 45–46); Marcq-en-Barœul
- Occupation: Photographer

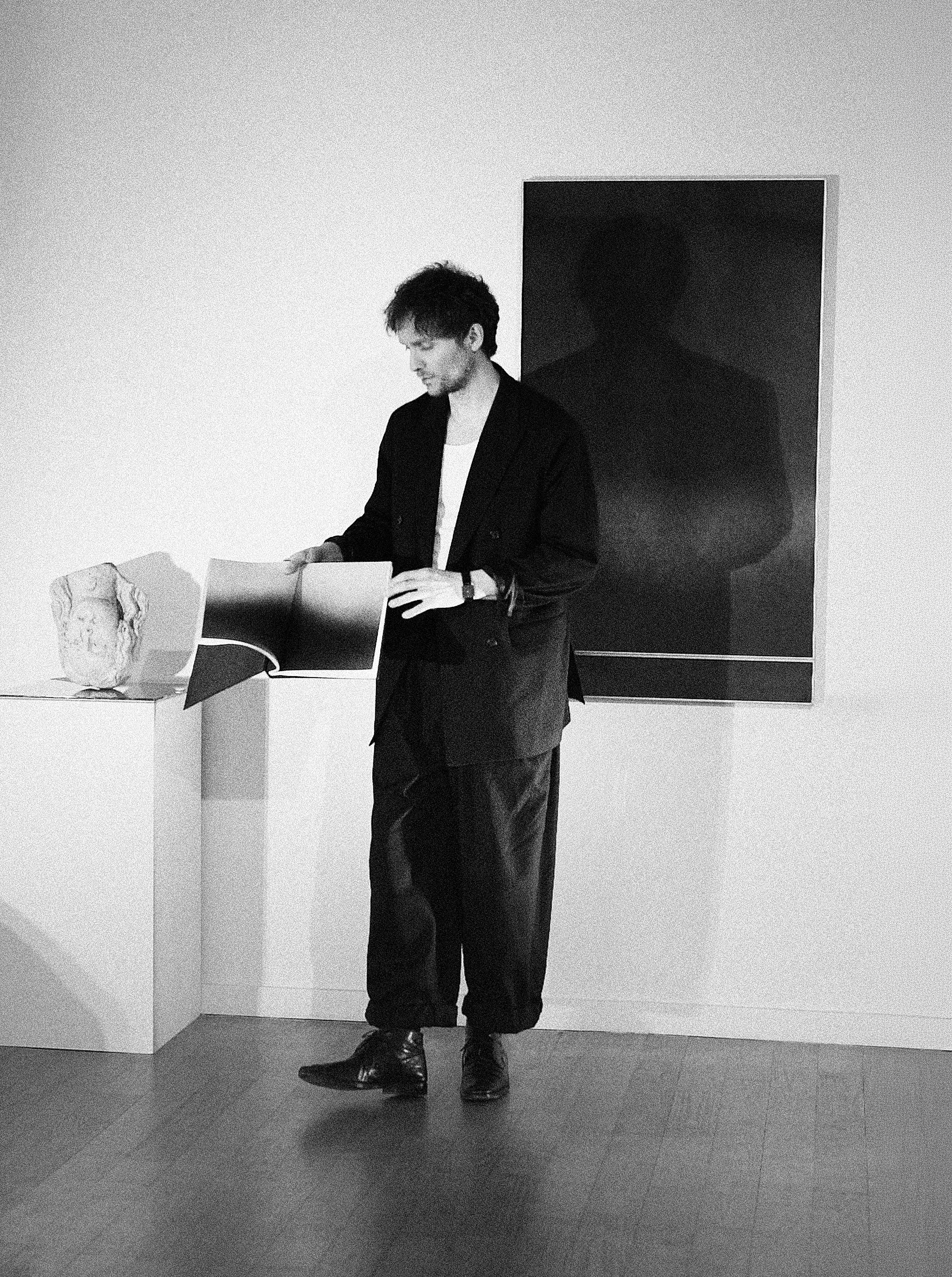
Portrait of Thomas Devaux, 2026

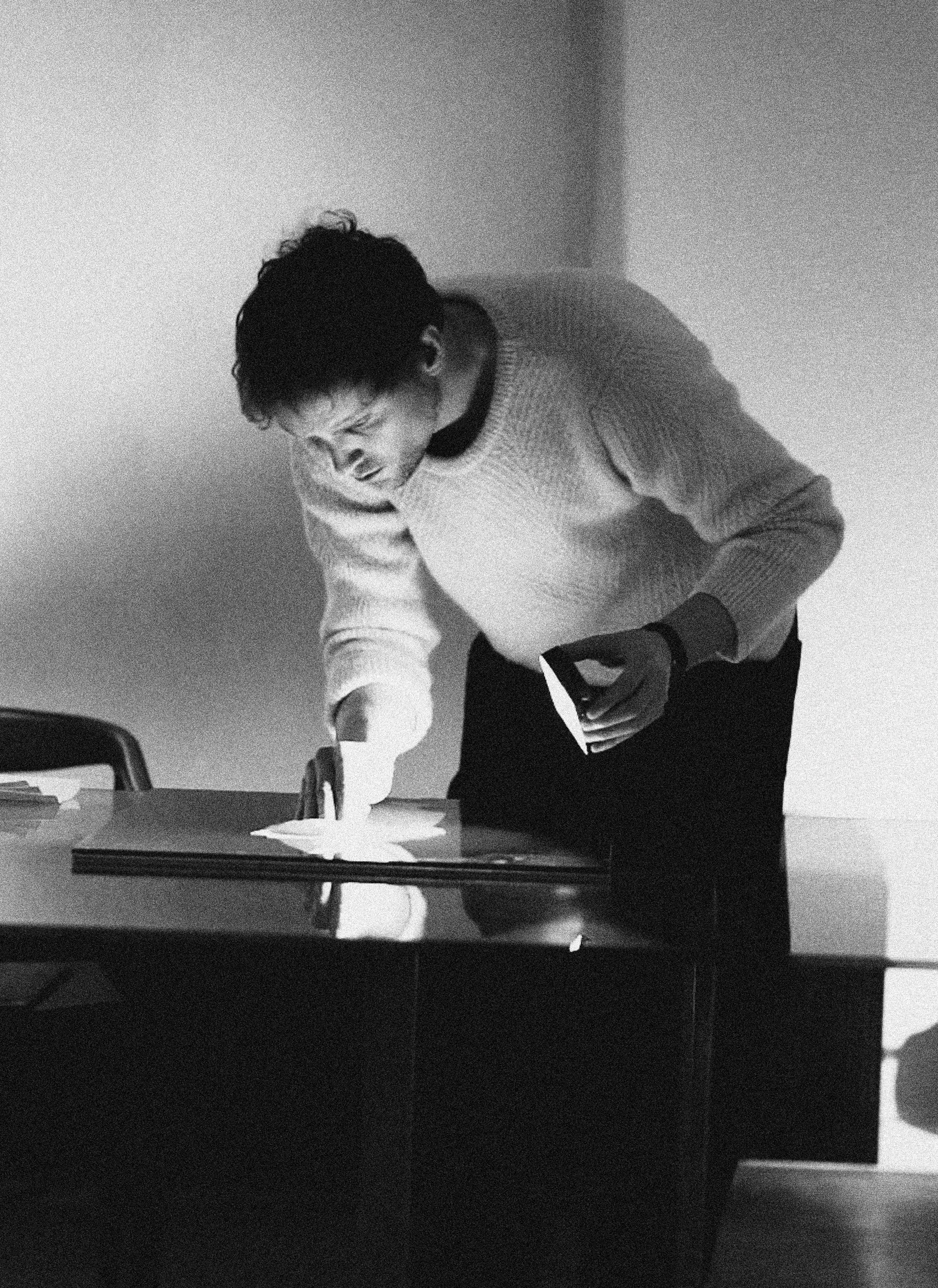

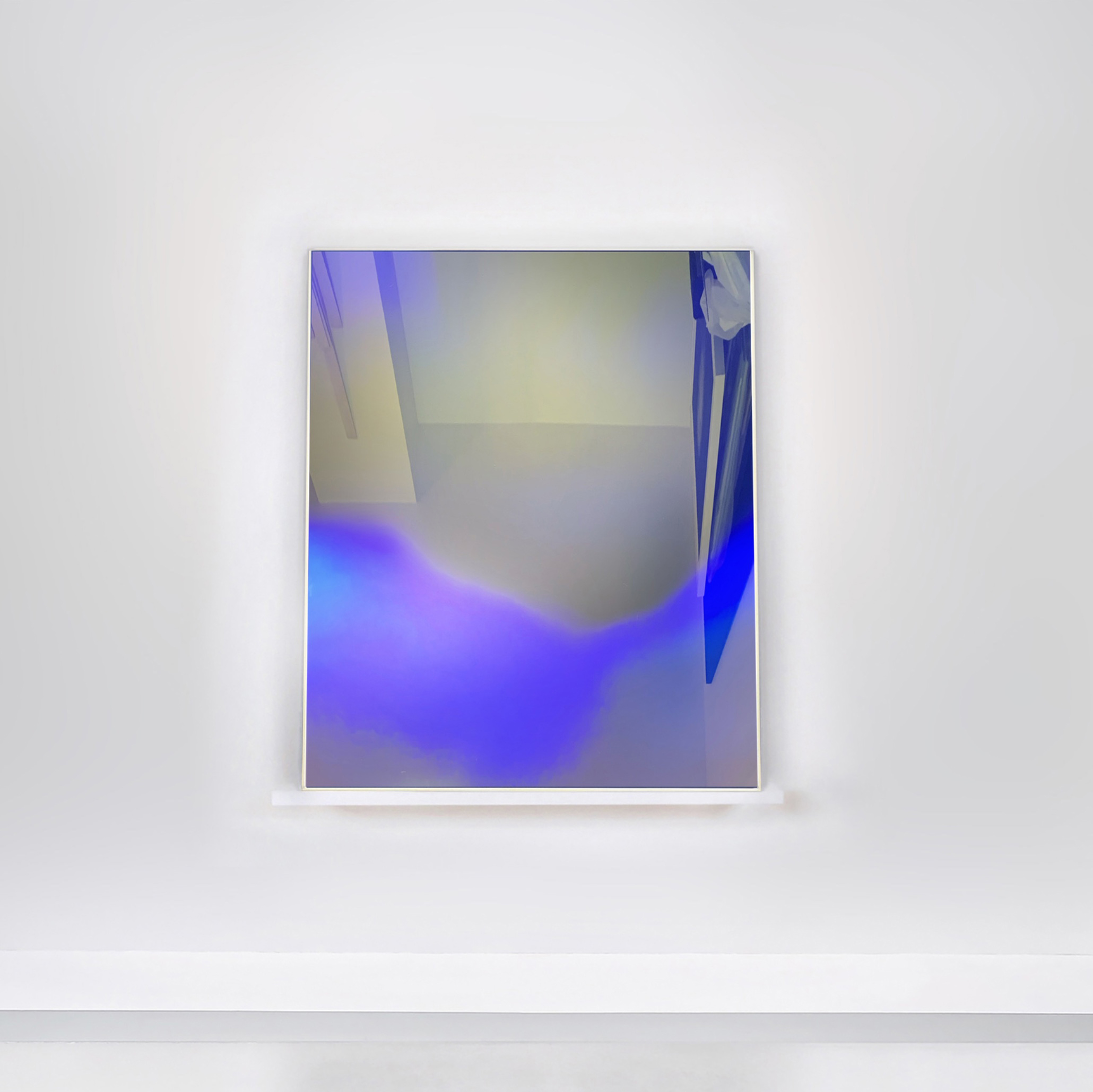
Dichroic 1.6

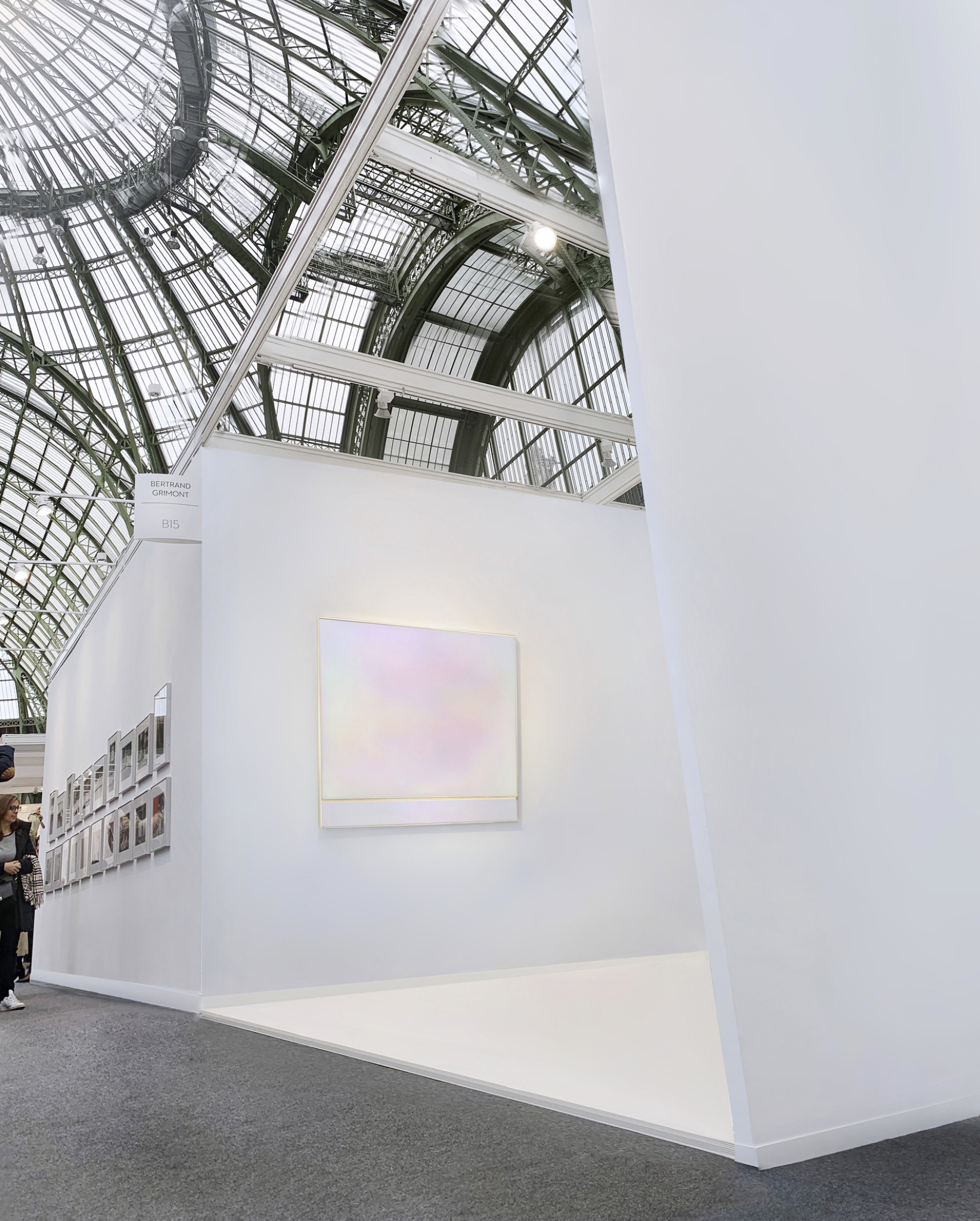
Rayon 9.66

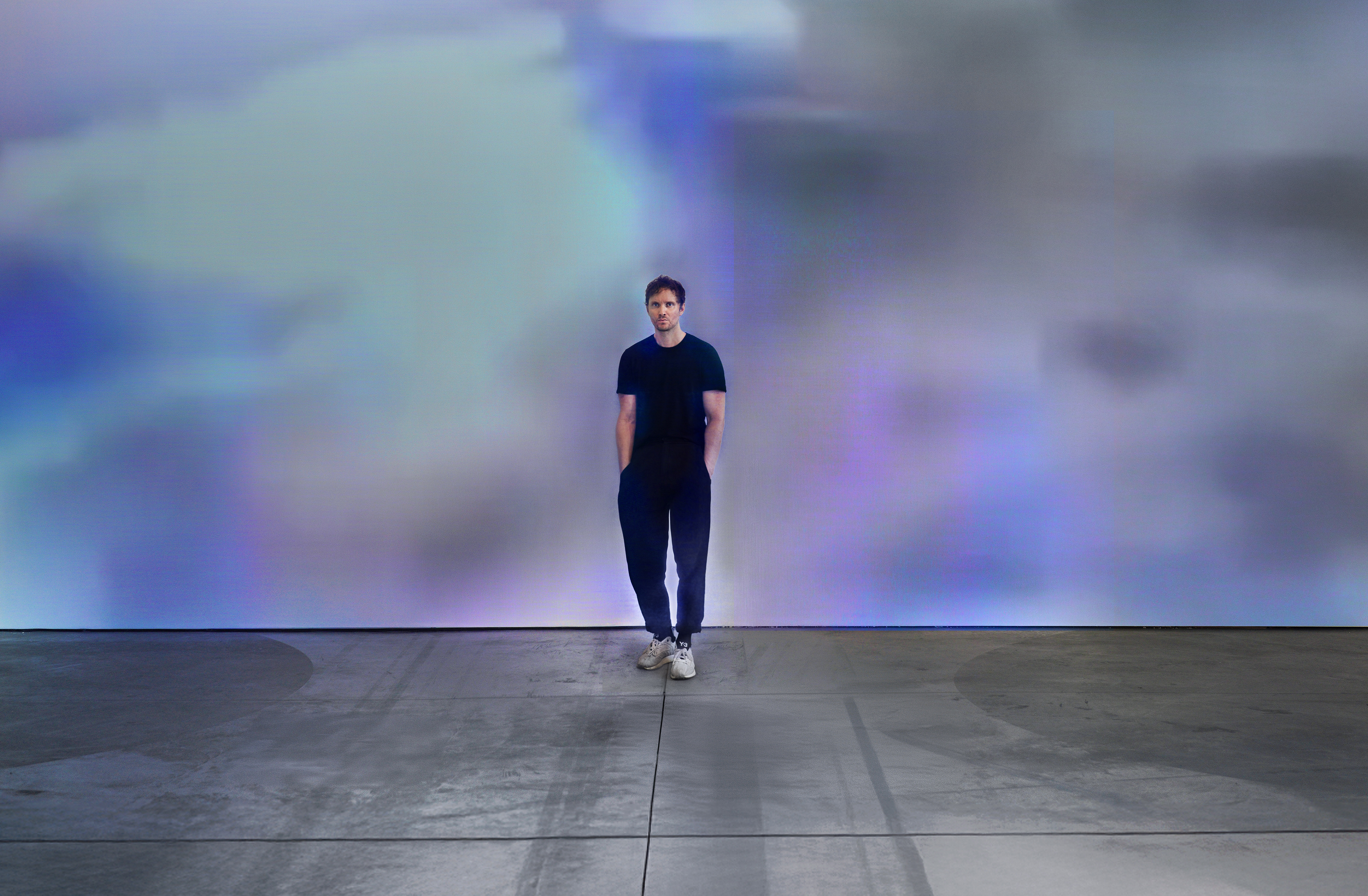
Portrait of Thomas Devaux, 2024

Thomas Devaux (born 1980, Marcq-en-Barœul) is a Paris-based photographer.

== Early life ==
Devaux became interested in photography as a youth. While studying film, he experimented with other media, including photography, experimental filmmaking, painting, and collage. His work lies somewhere between photography and painting, allowing him to pursue his investigation of sacred themes, profanity, and isolation.

In 2011, he won the Bourse du Talent #46 competition, organised by Photographie.com, Nikon, Picto, Herez, and the Bibliothèque Nationale de France. That same year, he was nominated for the “Prix Arte/Cutlog Art contemporain”.

In January 2012, filmmaker David Lynch exhibited Devaux's photos during the inauguration of his new Paris nightclub, Silencio. For Le Figaro, "his portraits of women taken at fashion shows and art openings, which are then digitally reworked, have a timeless grace that denounces with elegance the ephemeral character of beauty. Madonnas are damned for all eternity."

His photographs are included in collections such as Bibliothèque Nationale de France (BNF). In 2013, Devaux's work was exhibited in South Korea, China, France, Belgium, Russia, and Hong Kong. He was invited to present his work during the antiquity theatre soirées held during the Internationales de la Photographie d'Arles 2013.

== Process ==
Anne Biroleau-Lemagny, General Curator for 21st Century Contemporary Art at Bibliothèque Nationale de France (BNF) said, "Thomas Devaux is the author of several ambitious and complex series in which so many fundamental values, like evolution in photography, come into play. Photography’s index value cannot be denied. It is indeed a direct shot, but a shooting immediately considered a fragment of a future reconstruction." One of his processes involves photographing models at fashion shows, or of visitors at the openings of contemporary art expositions, such as at the FIAC, and using them as raw materials. He then transforms them via digital editing software.

According to L'Express, he uses fashion and the art world to “recompose a universe filled with symbols".

For Yann Datessen, a photography and crafts professor at the Sorbonne, Devaux's characters are “ether beauties, flannel monstrosities, latescent Valkyries, patched-up ghosts that we sanctify and profane at the same time... Like burned, worn-out, and gone up in smoke, these new magnetic and electrified bodies have the boreal appearance of worrisome divinities. Hydras with furry tongues, spectral face, torsos with seven hands, female Cerberus, the bestial that Thomas evokes is filled with Dante-esque and Tartarian metamorphoses..."
