= Clark and Pougnaud =

French artistic duo

Clark & Pougnaud
- Known for: Photography, painting
- Website: clarkpougnaud.com

Clark and Pougnaud are a French artistic duo, made up of photographer Christophe Clark, born in Paris on 29 October 1963, and painter Virginie Pougnaud, born in Angoulême on 18 November 1962.

== Biography ==
Clark and Pougnaud work and live in Paris. They began their artistic collaboration in 1999.

Their artworks are shown in the collections of the Musée Pouchkine and the Musée de l'image. Since 2012, they have been regularly represented by the Galerie Photo12 in Paris.

== Prices and awards ==
2000: Special mention of the Arcimboldo Price

2006: Laureate of the HSBC Price for Photography

== Exhibitions (selection) ==
2000: Hommage à Edward Hopper, Maison Européenne de la Photographie, Paris

2003: Les bourgeoises et les contes, Galerie Bruno Delarue, Paris

2004: Intimité, Galerie Esther Woerdehoff, Paris

2005: Picturing identity, Galerie Catherine Edelman, Chicago

2006: Galerie Baudouin Lebon

2007: Suspicious origins, Claire Olivier Gallery, New York City

2008: Mois de la Photo, Paris

2009: C'est la vie, Galerie Paci Contemporary, Brescia, Italy

2010: From infancy to the green age, Pouchkine Museum, Moscow

2011: Immobilis, La Filature, Mulhouse

2011: Théâtre d'Angoulême

2012: Galerie Photohub Manometr, Moscow

2012: Lost in meditation, Galerie Photo12, Paris

2014: Mood Indigo, Galerie Photo12, Paris
