= Christophe Beauregard =

French portrait photographer (born 1966)

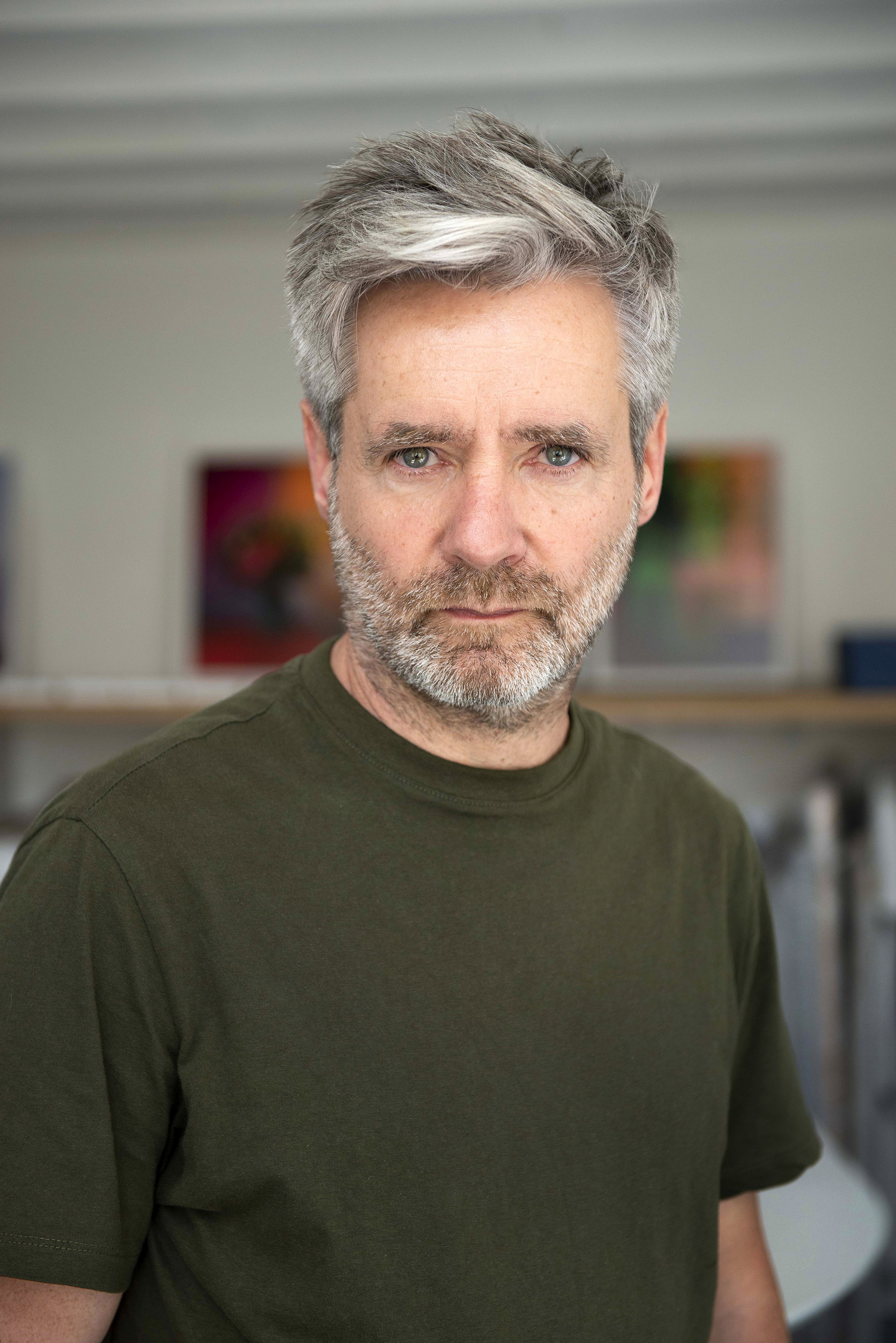
- Photo of Christophe Beauregard taken by Julien Caïdos
- Born: January 9, 1966 (age 60); Saintes; France
- Occupations: Commercial and fine art photographer
- Website: www.christophe-beauregard.com

Christophe Beauregard (born January 9, 1966) is a French portrait photographer who started his photographic career in the commercial sector. Initially working as a portraitist for the press and advertising campaigns he then jointly develop and pursue of his personal creative impulse. He is currently recognized in France and abroad as a contemporary photographer focusing on key themes such as identity and individualism in post-modern societies.

== Biography ==
Born in France in 1966, Christophe Beauregard lives and works in Paris. After earning a degree in literature, a pivotal moment came following his encounter with Sam Francis in his studio in Palo Alto in 1989 and a transformative year in Scotland, where Beauregard diligently practiced drawing and painting. This experience led him to enroll at the Beaux-Arts the subsequent year. Graduating in 1992, Beauregard chose to turn toward photography, becoming an assistant to numerous celebrity and fashion photographers. From 1996, he began producing celebrity portraits for press and advertising, and starting in 2003, he developed a distinct artistic practice.

The human body, both in a social and intimate context, is his subject of choice. Beauregard, fascinated by the symptoms of our contemporary hedonism and its representations, demonstrates through his photographs how our bodies bear the cost of our obsession with providing meaning to our existence, and how we crave uniqueness while also adhering to norms.

This unique approach to portraiture and its staging has earned Beauregard numerous prestigious collaborations, ranging from Dior to Berluti, including the Centre Pompidou-Metz and the CentQuatreParis in France. He has also been exhibited abroad at venues such as the Schirn Kunsthalle Frankfurt – DE, Alcatel Lucent – US, and the Museo dell’Opera del Duomo de Prato, IT. He is represented by Ségolène Brossette Galerie in France.

Beauregard's photographs have been published in "Manuel d’Esthétique" and "Semantic Tramps" (Filigranes Éditions), "Europe Echelle 27" (Trans Photographic Press), and "Sari" (Christophe Daviet-Théry). His work is regularly published in magazines like Le Monde, L’OEil, Libération, and Les Inrocks, and can be found in several private and public collections.

== Notable art series ==
- Polaroids paysages bleu, 2019-2022: Christophe Beauregard, initially constrained to his studio at Le Bateau-Lavoir during lockdown, transitioned from crafting staged, literature-inspired scenes using flowers and objects, to expanding his work outdoors and experimenting with Polaroids across various genres, introducing an element of unalterable immediacy and accidental artistry into his exploration of color, light, and fiction upon easing of restrictions.
- Polaroids natures mortes, 2019-2022: Christophe Beauregard utilized a Polaroid SX70 since 2019 to delve into diverse genres and explore color, light, figure, and fiction, initiating a series of literature-inspired, theatrical still life photography, termed "Short Stories," amidst the lockdown in his Bateau-Lavoir studio, which naturally evolved to outdoor settings, narrating potential human stories through crafted scenes and landscapes when restrictions eased.
- Vianney D., 2020-2022: Christophe Beauregard explores non-binary identity and duality through his latest series focused on Vianney Desplantes, intertwining portraiture and performance to delve into themes of ambivalence, desire, and wholeness, going beyond mere gender and transgressive voyeurism, and contemplating desire as both a wish to encapsulate a united, boundless self and a yearning for all-encompassing inclusivity.
- Polaroids fleurs, 2019-2022: Christophe Beauregard pivoted from creating literature-inspired, theatrical still life "Short Stories" in his Le Bateau-Lavoir studio during the initial lockdown, to organically expanding his work outdoors and profoundly exploring the unalterable and serendipitous nature of Polaroids, navigating through varied visual languages of portraiture, landscape, and still life upon the easing of restrictions.
- Fleurs, 2020-2022: During the 2020 Paris lockdown, portraitist Christophe Beauregard initiated "Fleurs, 2020," capturing flowers within his Bateau-Lavoir studio as symbolic, unaltered vignettes of resilience and vigor, representing those persisting amidst deprivation and uncertainty, and exploring freedom through space, perspective, light, and color amidst confinement.
- Why not portraits?, 2019-2022: Christophe Beauregard’s work, echoing Matisse's early canvases, intertwines models with printed backgrounds to dissect the relationship between figure and backdrop, investigating alignment or contrast between clothing material and background, while playfully deconstructing body language and exploring a post-modern conundrum of seeking individuality within norms through subjects that subtly embody a narrative of contemporary existential search.
- Sari, 2018: Christophe Beauregard's 2015 Corsican series "Sari" intertwines undistorted imagery of children enjoying unrestricted freedom amidst local natural scenery with a blend of idyllic and potentially ominous undertones, capturing genuine, sunlit innocence while subtly alluding to a concealed, looming threat, as observed by critic Dominique Baqué.
- It’s getting dark, 2013: Invited for a posing session, anonymous individuals veil their faces with a fabric of their choice; symbols of contemporary blindness, loss, and identity change.
- Devils in disguise, 2010: In this series set in the forest, children in disguise are captured in mid-action in a heroic posture reminiscent of popular superheroes.
- Semantic Tramps, 2008: Calling upon actors, Christophe Beauregard stages a series questioning the representation of poverty in the media.
- Pinder, 1993: Inspired by the work of August Sander, the photographer created his first series during his degree at the Beaux-Arts. It features numerous portraits of circus artists.

== Notables portraits ==
Laure Adler, Akhenaton, Mathieu Amalric, John Armleder, Yann Arthus-Bertrand, Georg Baselitz, Booba, Pascal Bruckner, John Cale, Philippe Decouflé, Dee Dee Bridgewater, Virginie Despentes, Emmanuelle Devos, Nicolas Duvauchelle, Fellag, Marie-Agnès Gillot, Michel Gondry, Dan Graham, Interpol, Aki Kaurismäki, Peter Klasen, Wolfgang Laib, Fabrice Luchini, Annette Messager, Philippe Meste, Takashi Miike, Jean-Pierre Mocky, Moebius, Peter Mullan, Sofi Oksanen, Erwin Olaf, Opus AKOBEN, Orlan, Jean d'Ormesson, Jean-Michel Othoniel, Richard Price, Atiq Rahimi, Yasmina Reza, Ugo Rondinone, Édith Scob, Alain Seban, Lhasa de Sela, Jorge Semprún, Michel Serrault, Ravi Shankar, Richard Shusterman, Simone Veil, Jacques Villeret, The Warlocks, Lambert Wilson...

== Personal exhibitions ==
- "Face à moi mon image", Ségolène Brossette Galerie, Paris, France, 2022
- "Trouble dans le portrait", Commisariat Paul Ardenne, Mairie 10e, Paris, France, 2022
- "Why Not Portraits?", Rencontres photographiques, Lorient, 2021
- "It's getting dark", Museo dell'Opera del Duomo & Galerie Die Mauer, Prato, Italie, 2020
- "Les Immémoriaux", Galerie Ségolène Brossette, Paris, 2019
- "Sari", Galerie Rue Antoine, Paris, 2018
- "Bricoler dans un mouchoir de poche", Centquatre, Paris, France, 2016
- "Trompe le monde", exposition personnelle, Galerie Briobox, Paris, France, 2011
- "BLING!", Galerie Fnac, Paris, France, 2010
- "Technomades", la Fondation Alcatel-Lucent, Naperville, Illinois, États-Unis, 2010
- "Las Vegas", Festival Voies Off Arles, France, 2009
- "Technomades", Atrium Alcatel-Lucent, Paris, France, 2009
- "Semantic tramps", L'été photographique de Lectoure, Lectoure, France, 2008

== Group exhibitions ==
- "La cabane dans l’ombre", Ségolène Rosette Galerie, Paris, France, 2023
- "Why Not Portraits", Les Photographiques, Le Mans, France, 2023
- "Fragilité en miroir", Semantic Tramps, Galerie Le CRI des Lumières, Lunéville, France, 2022
- "Work in Progress", Ségolène Brossette Galerie, Paris, France, 2019
- "Robots et légendes", Nuit Blanche, Mairie du 18e, Paris, France, 2019
- "L'Italie au Bateau-Lavoir, Espace d'exposition du Bateau-Lavoir, Paris, France, 2019
- "Gardien du monde", Ségolène Brossette Galerie, Les rencontres d'Arles, France, 2018
- "Super(WO)man", Maison des Arts, Chevilly-Larue, France, 2018
- "Unforgettable (You!)", NR Gallery, Londres, UK, 2017
- "Pentimento", Fondation Ortiz, Arles, France, 2017
- "It's getting dark", Nuit Blanche, Paris, France, 2016
- "Paparazzi ! Photographes, stars et artistes", Centre Pompidou-Metz, France, 2014
- "Paparazzi ! Photographes, stars et artistes", Schirn Kunsthalle Frankfurt, De, 2014
- "Par nature", Centquatre Paris, France, 2013
- "La nuit de l'année", RIP Arles, France, 2012
- "Transformation du paysage", La Nuit Blanche, Montréal, Ca, 2009
- "Las Vegas", Festival Voies Off Arles, France, 2009
- "Semantic Tramps", L'été photographique de Lectoure, France, 2008
- "EUROPE échelle 27", la Cité des Arts, Mois de la photo-Paris, France, 2008
- "L'exposition en tant qu'outil de diffusion", Salle Journiac, Université Paris 1 Panthéon-Sorbonne, Paris, France, 2004

== Publications ==
- "Les Immémoriaux", Ségolène Brossette Galerie, 2019
- "It’s Getting Dark", Christophe Beauregard, 2019
- "Sari", Christophe Daviet-Thery & Exposed, Texte Dominique Baqué, 2018
- "Ce n'est pas une maison mais mille", Drac & CD 93, Christophe Daviet-Thery, 2017
- "Chahut", la Nouvelle Galerie & Christophe Beauregard, 2015
- Semantic tramps, [13 photographies couleurs, texte d’Arlette Farge], Italie, Filigranes Éditions, September 2008
- EUROPE échelle 27, [150 photographies couleurs, textes Laura Serani et Michel Foucher], Italie, Signatures / Trans Photographic Press Paris, June 2008
- Chirurgies, [portfolio de 13 photographies couleurs, tirage de 8 exemplaires], France, Alice Travel Cie, 2006
- Manuel d’esthétique, [16 photographies couleurs, textes Vladimir Mitz et Nicolas Thély], France, Filigranes Éditions, November 2005

== Residencies and prizes ==
- Creative Residency, Centquatre, Paris, 2021
- Art & Culture Residency, Lycée Hélène Boucher, DRAC Idf & Rectorat de Paris, France, 2017-2019
- Residency CLEA, DRAC Idf & Conseil départemental 93, Villemomble, France, 2015-2017
- Creative Residency DRAC Idf, Écoles P. Budin, Paris, 2016
- The Beholders, Creative Residency with Centre Pompidou-Metz, France, 2014
- Residency Finalist BMW, Musée Nicéphore Niepce, France, 2014
- Creative Residency, Centquatre, Paris, 2011

== Sources and critiques ==
- Paul Ardenne, Trouble dans le portrait, 2022
- Why not portraits ?, Alex Gobin, Revue point contemporain, 2020
- Dominique Baqué, Tous les soirs du monde, catalogue Sari, 2018
- "Angoulême: ses photos font mouche jusqu’aux États-Unis", 22 juillet 2014, Charentelibre Tuider, Katherine. Interview with Christophe Beauregard, 19 May 2014, Paris, France.
- Guerrin Michel, "Le marché des images de paparazzi", catalogue Paparazzi! Photographes Stars et Artistes, Éditions Centre Pompidou-Metz / Flammarion, p. 68-69, January 2014
- Illouz Audrey, "Under Cover", catalogue Under Cover, GRK Gallery, p. 2-3, November 2014
- Tonda, Philippe. Interview with Christophe Beauregard, "Devils in Disguise", 2010, Paris, France.
- Saint-Pierre François, "Inventer la présence", catalogue Inventer le présent, Les Abattoirs-Frac Midi-Pyrénées, p. 56-57, Spring 2010
- Baqué Dominique, L'effroi du présent - Figurer la violence, Flammarion, p. 228-229, September 2009
- Farge Arlette, Semantic tramps, Filigranes éditions, p. 29-35, September 2008
- "Misère en Scène", Libération, 21 October 2007
- Lefort Gérard, "Misère en scène", Libération, August 2007
- Thély Nicolas, "Technique d'effacement", Manuel d'Esthétique Filigranes éditions, p. 50-51, November 2005
- "Nouvelle peau", Libération, August 2005

== Productions ==
2014

- Ceux qui détiennent – Sam Francis, "In Lovely Blueness (N°1)", dans l'oeil d'Anastasia, [carte postale, 600 exemplaires édités], France, Centre Pompidou-Metz, November 2014

2010

- Devils in Disguise – Luckibill, [poster édité en 125 tirages jet d'encre pigmentaire], France, Galerie TPTP Space, 2010
