= Dani Olivier =

French photographer (born 1969)

Dani Olivier (born 1969) is a French photographer known for his work in abstract nude photography. He graduated from the business school HEC Paris.

Olivier began practicing photography as a teenager in an informal weekly photography club in Paris.

Between 2000 and 2006, he explored digital self-portraits, asking his models to use a digital camera to take their first nude selfies. His goal was to capture a unique, unrepeatable moment: a person’s very first self-portrait, taken before the widespread popularity of selfies.

Since 2007, Olivier has specialized in abstract nude photography, creating compositions by projecting patterns onto his models and incorporating movement and optical distortion. He employs a minimalist setup—"a body, a black backdrop, and lights"—combined with high-end light projectors and state-of-the-art cameras.

== Books ==
- Nus abstraits (2011), ISBN 978-2-35355-776-9
- Nus abstraits et psychédéliques (2011), ISBN 978-2-35355-776-9
- Nus corps et âme (2015)

== Selected exhibitions ==
- Kiev, Ukraine, 2010 and 2012: at the Found Art Gallery
- Paris, France, 2012: At the Art and Events Gallery
- Moscow, Russia, 2012: LUX Exhibition
- Arles, France, 2015: Voies off (fringe festival) “Nude Body and Soul”
- Paris, France, 2015: La quatrième image
- Los Angeles, USA, 2015, MOPLA (Month of Photography Los Angeles 2015)
- Arles, France, 2015: Voies off photo festival - exhibition “Nude Body and Soul”
- Paris, France, October 2015: "La quatrième image" photo festival
- Paris, France, November 2015 : Fotofever Paris Art Fair 2015 (solo-show)
- Los Angeles, USA, January 2016 : photoLA 2016 (solo-show)
- Basel, Switzerland, March 2016 : Exhibition at BaselWorld
- Paris, France, April 2016 : exhibition at Costes Hotel
- Paris, France, June 2016 : exhibition at ArtPhotoBy gallery
- Paris, France, November 2016 : Fotofever Paris 2016 art fair (solo-show)
- Brussels, Belgium, May-November 2017 : exhibition at the M-E-M Museum
- Arles, France, juillet-août 2017 : Voies off photo festival - Exhibition "Women of Light"
- Saint-Tropez, July–August 2017 : exhibitions at Nikki Beach Saint-Tropez and at Brasserie des Arts
- Villeréal, France, August 2017 : Guest of honour at FocaleNuArt photo festival
- Paris, France, September 2017-January 2018 : exhibition at Bar 153
- Paris, France, November 2017 : Fotofever Paris Art Fair 2017 (solo-show)
- Saint-Denis, France, November 2017, Guest of honour of the 61st festival of"Union des Arts Plastiques de Saint-Denis"
