= Jean-Michel Voge =

French photographer (born 1949)

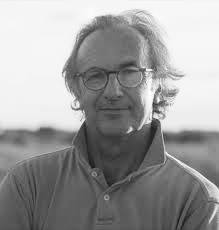
- Voge in 2015
- Born: May 10, 1949 (age 77); Valence, France
- Known for: Photographer
- Notable work: "Figures d'Europe" Editions de la Martinière 1992
- Website: www.jmvoge.fr

Jean–Michel Voge (born May 10, 1949) is a French photographer who has worked since 1978 with numerous magazines such as Madame Figaro, Le Figaro Magazine, Point de vue, Marie France, Town and Country, European Travel and Life, Fortune Magazine and AD Espagne.

== Biography ==
Jean-Michel Voge was born on May 10, 1949, in Valence. After studying law, he began to work in finance and branched off towards photography in 1978. He started working for many French and foreign magazines.

From 1982 to 2010, he initially worked for Madame Figaro and then to Figaro Magazine... Voge worked with Guy Sorman on reports and series on great thinkers and creators through portraits.

It was these meetings that prompted him to publish "Figures d’Europe" in the Éditions de la Martinièr. This project gathered not only portraits of fifty men and women representing the spiritual, intellectual, scientific and artistic work of Europe, but also a photo of their hands often accompanied by a handwritten note. Voge also became friends with the American historian Steven Laurence Kaplan who prefaced the book Figures d'Europe. He hosted it during his stay in Paris as it recalls parts of his book Farewell Revolution -1789-1989 »

In 1989, he participated in the photography month of Paris with an exhibition on Japan.

He did not continue exhibiting until November 2008, with an exhibition on the Surmas at the Galerie Xavier Nicolas

From 2010, when he finally left the press, he devoted himself to his personal projects and has exhibited since then. In 2010, at the Espace Pierre Premier in Serbia, he had an exhibition with his partner Catherine Painvin

In October 2013 at the Galerie du Passage of Paris, Voge had an exhibition titled "Sumos " and "Arbres en Aubrac l’hiver " in which he photographed during his partnership with Catherine Painvin. In August 2014, Voge had another exhibition titled "La Namibie" at the Urs von Unger Gallery in Saanen, Gstaad. In 2015, Voge had an exhibition titled "Ombre et Lumière" in Brazil for the APCd Foundation of Marly, Switzerland. He then had another exhibition called "Vision d'Iran" in the Galerie Chevalier of Paris, France. Voge also had an exhibition titled "Iconic Diary" at the 6t6 Art Gallery in Miami Beach, Florida (U.S.).

In 2015, he met and partnered with Anna Alexis Michel on the photographic project "The Meringue Project » " which talks about female sexuality using a meringue.Together, they also undertook the development and dissemination of its archives as a tribute to the great figures of the second half of the twentieth century.

== Awards and recognition ==
- Voge and Anna Alexis Michel won the photo competition "Building Bridges to End FGM" by l’ONG End FGM with their photo "Endless Beauty". In January 2016, this photo was exhibited at the Esplanade Solidarnösc in the European Parliament of Brussels.

== Publications ==
- "Figures d'Europe" Éditions de la Martiniere 1992

== Exhibitions ==
- 1989 Photo of the Month - Solo Exhibition "Les Japonais" » AGF - Paris (France).
- 1992 Figures d'Europe - Following the publication of the book "Figures d'Europe" at the Editions de la Martinière Solo exhibition AGF - Paris (France) .
- 2008 Solo Exhibition "les Surmas" - Galerie Xavier Nicolas - Paris (France)
- 2010 Exhibition « Interview with Catherine Painvin
- 2013 Solo Exhibition "Les Sumos" and " Aubrac en Hiver " - at the Galerie du passage of Pierre Passebon - Paris (France) (virtual visit of the Galerie Aubrac+Sumo)) (lecture on book "Sumo")
- 2014 Solo Exhibition "Namibie" - at the Galerie Urs von Unger - Saanen Gstaad (Switzerland) (virtual visit)
- 2015 Collective Exhibition at Festival Kolga Tbilisi Photo (Géorgie) (Exhibition catalog p. 356-359)
- 2015 (From June 18 to September 19) Black and White Photos "Paranapiacaba"; Collective Exhibition "Hors Piste" for APCd Fondation (formerly called ILFORD) - Marly - Fribourg (Switzerland) (link APCd).
- 2015 (From November 7 to 22) " Vision d'Iran » -" part of PHOTO SAINT GERMAIN in the Galerie Chevalier - Paris (France).
- 2015 (From November 1 to the 30th) "Iconic Diary]" at the 6t6 Art Gallery MIAMI BEACH (U.S.).
- 2015 (From December 1 to the 31st) "The Meringue Project" at the 6t6 Art Gallery MIAMI BEACH (U.S.).
- 2015 Video Installation "The Meringue Project".
