= Laurent Biancani =

French photographer

Laurent Biancani (1933–2003) was a French photographer.
