= Photo (French magazine) =

French men's magazine devoted to photography and erotica

- Categories: Photography
- Founded: 1967
- Company: EPMA
- Country: France
- Based in: Paris
- Language: French
- Website: www.photo.fr
- ISSN: 0399-8568

Photo is a French men's magazine devoted to photography and erotica was previously published by Hachette Filipacchi Médias, and currently owned by EPMA.

== History and profile ==
Photo was started by Hachette Filipacchi Médias as a monthly publication in 1967, and it was modeled on the men's magazine American Photo. The magazine is published ten times a year. It concentrates on the artistic aspects of photography, rather than technical aspects. The editorial line is tripartite: fashion/nude/glamour, historical images of wars/guillotines/poverty or similar, and selected journalism news photos from around the world. It is read and distributed around the world, and is known featuring naked models, colorful saturated graphic images, and its annual amateur photography contest. It was sold by Hachette Filipacchi in 2011.

An American edition was published under the name Photo World from 1973 to 1978. From 1976 to 1977 it was published by Penthouse as Penthouse Photo World.

== See also ==
- List of men's magazines
- Pin-up model
