= Louis Legrand (photographer) =

French photographer

Louis Legrand (19th century) was a French photographer based in Shanghai who may have been commissioned to accompany French forces and photographically document their participation in the Anglo-French military expedition to northern China during the Second Opium War in 1860. No evidence has yet been found that Legrand actually joined the expedition or took photographs on it.
