= List of French artists =

The following is a chronological list of French artists working in visual or plastic media (plus, for some artists of the 20th century, performance art). For alphabetical lists, see the various subcategories of Category:French artists. See other articles for information on French literature, French music, French cinema and French culture.

== Middle Ages ==
- Gislebertus (12th century), sculptor
- Pierre de Montreuil (c. 1200–1266), architect
- Villard de Honnecourt (13th century), other media
- Jean Pucelle (active 1325–28), other media
- Jean Malouel (Dutch, worked in Burgundy) (1365–1415), painter
- Anastasia (fl. c. 1400), manuscript illuminator
- Claus Sluter (Dutch, worked in Burgundy from 1395–1406), sculptor
- the Limbourg brothers (Pol and Hermann) (Dutch artists working in Burgundy around 1403–1416), other media

== Renaissance ==
- Jacques Morel (c. 1395–1459), sculptor
- Enguerrand Quarton (c. 1410 – c. 1466), painter, miniatures
- Henri Bellechose (Flemish born) (active 1415–1440), painter
- Simon Marmion (c. 1420–1489), illuminations
- Jean Fouquet (1420–1481), painter, illuminations
- Jean Colombe (1430–1493), illuminations
- Michel Colombe (c. 1430 – c. 1515), sculptor
- Nicolas Froment (c. 1450 – c. 1490), painter
- Jean Perréal (c. 1455 – c. 1528), painter, illuminations
- Antoine Le Moiturier (active in the 1460s), sculptor
- Jean Clouet (c. 1485–1541) (Flemish born), painter, miniatures
- Jean Duvet (c. 1485 – c. 1570), engraver
- Josse Lieferinxe (active 1493–1508) (Flemish born), painter
- Nicolas Dipre (fl. 1495–1532), painter
- Jehan Cousin the elder (1500–1593), painter, engraver, sculptor
- Ligier Richier (1500–1567), sculptor
- Pierre Quesnel (c.1502–1580), painter
- Philibert Delorme (or de L'Orme) (1505/1510–1570), sculptor, architectural plans
- Pierre Bontemps (1505/1510–after 1562), sculptor
- Jean Goujon (c. 1510 – c. 1565), sculptor
- Bernard Palissy (1510–1590), master potter
- Jacques Androuet du Cerceau (c. 1510–1585), architectural plans
- Jean Juste (active 1515–1530), sculptor
- François Clouet (c. 1515–1572) (son of Jean Clouet), painter
- Pierre Lescot (c. 1515–1578), sculptor, architect
- Antoine Caron (c. 1521–1599), painter
- Jean Cousin the Younger (c. 1522–1593), painter
- Germain Pilon (c.1535–1590), sculptor
- Barthélemy Prieur (c.1536–1616), sculptor
- Étienne Dumonstier (1540–1603), painter
- Ambroise Dubois (c.1542–1614) (Flemish born), painter
- Pierre Dumonstier I (c.1545–c.1610), painter
- Thomas de Leu (1560–1612), engraver
- Toussaint Dubreuil (c.1561–1602), painter
- Léonard Gaultier (c.1561-1641), engraver
- Martin Fréminet (1567–1619), painter
- Frans Pourbus the younger (1569–1622) (Flemish born), painter
- Jacques Bellange (1575–1616) (in Lorraine), engraver
- Jean Decourt (active 1570s), painter
- François Quesnel (active 1580s), painter
- Jacques Patin (active 1580s), engraver
- Jean de Beaugrand (1584–1640), lineographer

== Seventeenth century ==
See also French Baroque and Classicism, Louis XIII, Cardinal Richelieu, Baroque, Louis XIV, Palace of Versailles, Classicism

- Philippe Millereau (1570–1610), painter
- Daniel Dumonstier (1574–1646), draftsman
- Pierre Dumonstier II (1585–1656), draftsman
- Claude Deruet (1588–1660) (in Lorraine), painter
- Simon Vouet (1590–1649), painter
- Jacques Callot (1592–1635) (in Lorraine), engraver
- Georges de La Tour (1593–1652), painter
- Claude Vignon (1593–1670), painter, printmaker, illustrator
- Nicolas Poussin (1594–1665), painter
- Antoine Le Nain (before 1600–?), painter
- Louis Le Nain (after 1600–?), painter
- Nicolas Lagneau (fl c. 1600–c. 1650), draftsman
- Abraham Bosse (1602–1676), engraver
- Claude Gelée, called Claude Lorrain (1600–1682), painter
- Philippe de Champaigne (1602–1674)
- Pierre-Antoine Lemoine (1605–1665), still-life painter
- Laurent de La Hyre (1606–1565), painter
- Mathieu Le Nain (1607–c.1677), painter
- Louise Moillon (1610–1696), painter
- Pierre Mignard (1612–1695), painter
- Gaspard Dughet (1613–1675), painter
- André Le Nôtre (1613–1700), landscape architect
- Eustache Le Sueur (1616–1655), painter
- Sébastien Bourdon (1616–1671), painter
- Charles Le Brun (1619–1690), painter, other media
- Pierre Paul Puget (1620–1694), sculptor
- Guillaume Courtois (1628–1679), painter and etcher
- François Girardon (1628–1715), sculptor
- Catherine Duchemin (1630–1698), painter
- Claude Lefèbvre (1633–1675), painter and engraver
- Claudine Bouzonnet-Stella (1636–1697), engraver
- Charles de la Fosse (1636–1716), painter
- Antoine Coysevox (1640–1720), sculptor
- Antoinette Bouzonnet-Stella (1641–1676), engraver
- Étienne Allegrain (1644–1736), topographical painter
- Jean Jouvenet (1644–1717), painter
- François de Troy (1645–1730), painter
- Madeleine Boullogne (1646–1710), still life painter
- Marie Blancour (fl. 1650–1699), painter
- Marie Courtois (c.1655–1703), miniature painter
- Nicolas de Largillière (1656–1746), painter
- Nicolas Coustou (1658–1733), sculptor
- Hyacinthe Rigaud (1659–1743), painter
- Antoine Coypel (1661–1722), sculptor
- François Desportes (1661–1743), painter

== Eighteenth century ==
See also Palace of Versailles, Louis XV, Madame de Pompadour, Rococo, Louis XVI, Neoclassicism, Enlightenment, Gobelins. For art criticism, see Denis Diderot

- Alexis Simon Belle (1674–1734)
- Jean-François de Troy (1679–1752) (son of François), painter
- Marie-Anne Horthemels (1682–1727), engraver
- Antoine Watteau (1684–1721), painter
- Jean-Baptiste van Loo (1684–1745), painter
- Jean-Marc Nattier (1685–1766), painter
- Jean-Baptiste Oudry (1686–1755), painter
- Louise-Magdeleine Horthemels (1686–1767), engraver
- Frédéric Horthemels (1688–1737), engraver
- François Lemoyne (1688–1737), painter
- Nicolas Lancret (1690–1743), painter
- Charles-Antoine Coypel (1694–1752), painter, art commentator, and playwright
- Jean-Baptiste Pater (1695–1736), painter
- Jean-Baptiste-Siméon Chardin (1699–1779), painter
- Charles Joseph Natoire (1700–1777), painter
- Louis-François Roubiliac (1702–1762), sculptor
- Jean-Étienne Liotard (1702–1789), painter
- François Boucher (1703–1770), painter, engraver
- Maurice Quentin de La Tour (1704–1788), painter
- Jean-Baptiste Lemoyne (1704–1778), painter, sculptor
- Charles-André van Loo (Carle Van Loo) (1705–1765) (brother of Jean-Baptiste van Loo), painter
- Louis-Michel van Loo (1707–1771) (son of Jean-Baptiste van Loo), painter
- Jean-Baptiste Pigalle (1714–1785), sculptor
- Claude Joseph Vernet (1714–1789), painter
- Jean-Baptiste Perronneau (1715–1783), painter
- Etienne-Maurice Falconet (1716–1791), sculptor
- Charles-Louis Clérisseau (1721–1820), draughtsman, watercolorist, painter in gouache
- Joseph-Marie Vien (1716–1809), painter
- Charles-Amédée-Philippe van Loo (1719–1795) (son of Jean-Baptiste van Loo), painter
- Charles Germain de Saint Aubin (1721–1786), engraver, embroidery designer
- Jean-Baptiste Greuze (1725–1805), painter
- François-Hubert Drouais (Drouais le fils) (1727–1775), painter
- Jean-Baptiste Defernex (1729–1783), sculptor
- Jean-Honoré Fragonard (1732–1806), painter
- Jean-Jacques Durameau (1733–1796), painter
- Hubert Robert (1733–1808), painter, engraver
- Marie-Suzanne Giroust (1734–1772), painter
- Joseph Ducreux (1735–1802), painter
- Étienne de La Vallée Poussin (1735–1802), French history painter and creator of interior decorative schemes
- Louis Albert Guislain Bacler d'Albe (1761–1824), painter
- Nicolas Bernard Lépicié (1735–1784), painter
- Nicolas Benjamin Delapierre (1739–c.1800), painter
- A. Duval, artist and engraver active 1769-1801
- Jean Antoine Houdon (1741–1828), sculptor
- Jean-Michel Moreau (Moreau the younger) (1741–1814), engraver
- Anne Vallayer-Coster (1744–1818), painter
- Jacques-Louis David (1748–1825), painter
- Claude-Jean-Baptiste Hoin (1750–1817), portrait artist
- Jacques-Antoine-Marie Lemoine (1751–1824), portrait and landscape artist
- Michel Garnier (1753–1819), painter
- Rosalie Filleul (1752–1794), painter
- Antoine Berjon (1754–1843), painter and designer
- Jean-Baptiste Regnault (1754–1829)
- Élisabeth Vigée Le Brun (1755–1842), painter
- Alexandre-Hyacinthe Dunouy (1757–1841), painter known for his landscapes
- Pierre Prudhon (1758–1823), painter

== Nineteenth century (Romanticism to Impressionism) ==
See also French Revolution, Napoleon, Romanticism, Barbizon school, Naturalism, Symbolism, Impressionism, Academic art, Napoleon III, Photography, Modernism

- Louis-Léopold Boilly (1761–1845), painter
- Joseph Nicéphore Niépce (1765–1833), photographer
- Adélaïde Dufrénoy (1765–1825), poet and painter from Brittany
- Anne-Louis Girodet de Roussy-Trioson (1767–1824), painter
- Jean-Baptiste Isabey (1767–1855), painter
- Antoine Jean Gros (1771–1835), painter
- Pierre Narcisse Guérin (1771–1833), painter
- Adélaïde Victoire Hall (1772–1844), painter
- Benjamin de Rolland (1773-1855), painter
- Eustache-Hyacinthe Langlois (1777–1837), painter, draftsman
- Jean-Baptiste Goyet (1779–1854), painter
- Jean Auguste Dominique Ingres (1780–1867), painter
- Étienne Bouhot (1780–1862), painter and art teacher
- Alexandre-François Caminade (1783–1862), portraitist and religious painter
- François Rude (1784–1855), sculptor
- Eugénie Charen (1786–1824), painter
- Louis-Jacques Daguerre (1787–1851), photographer
- Charles de Steuben (1788–1856), painter active during the Napoleonic Era
- Horace Vernet (1789–1863), painter
- Jules Robert Auguste (c.1789–1850), painter
- Elisa de Lamartine (1790–1863), painter and sculptor
- Théodore Géricault (1791–1824), painter
- Nicolas Toussaint Charlet (1792–1845), painter
- Antoine-Louis Barye (1795–1875), sculptor
- Ary Scheffer (1795–1858), painter
- Raymond Bonheur (1796–1849), painter
- Jean-Baptiste-Camille Corot (1796–1875), painter
- Fanny Alaux (1797–1880), painter
- Paul Delaroche (1797–1856), painter
- Julie Hugo (1797–1865), painter
- Eugène Goyet (1798–1857), painter
- Eugène Delacroix (1798–1863), painter
- Xavier Leprince (1799–1826), painter
- Alfred Johannot (1800–1837), painter and engraver
- Hippolyte Bellangé (1800–1866), painter
- François-Gabriel Lépaulle (1804-1888), painter
- Camille Chantereine (1810–1847), painter
- Achille Devéria (1800–1857), painter, engraver
- Charles Philipon (1800–1861), caricaturist
- Hippolyte Bayard (1801–1887), photographer
- Paul Huet (1803–1869), painter
- François-Émile de Lansac (1803–1890), painter
- Grandville (Jean Ignace Isidore Gérard, called) (1803–1847), engraver
- Eugène Isabey (1803–1886), painter
- Denis Auguste Marie Raffet (1804–1860), painter
- Édouard Viénot (born 1804), painter
- Zoé Goyet (died 1869), pastel portrait artist
- Eugène Lepoittevin (1806–1870), painter
- Honoré Daumier (1808–1879), painter, lithographer, sculptor
- Louis Boulanger (1806–1867), painter
- Narcisse Virgile Diaz de la Peña (1808–1878) (born in Spain), painter
- Auguste Préault (1809–1879), sculptor
- Ignace François Bonhomme (1809–1881), painter
- Constant Troyon (1810–1865), painter
- Eugène André Oudiné (1810–1875), sculptor, engraver
- Jules Dupré (1811–1889), painter
- Théodore Rousseau (1812–1867), painter
- Boissard de Boisdenier (1813–1866), painter
- Charles Jacque (1813–1894), painter
- Jean-François Millet (1814–1875), painter
- Thomas Couture (1815–1879), painter
- Blanche Hennebutte-Feillet (1815–1886), lithographer
- Jean-Louis-Ernest Meissonier (1815–1891), painter
- Jacques-Eugene Feyen (1815–1908), painter
- Charles Marville (1816–1879), painter, engraver, photographer
- Antoine Chintreuil (1816–1873), painter
- Jean Pierre Alexandre Antigna (1817–1878), painter
- François Bonvin (1817–1887), painter
- Charles-François Daubigny (1817–1878), painter
- Johan Barthold Jongkind (1819–1891) (Dutch, worked in France), painter
- Théodore Chassériau (1819–1856), painter
- Gustave Courbet (1819–1877), painter
- Eugène Fromentin (1820–1876), painter
- Nadar (Gaspard Félix Tournachon, called "Nadar") (1820–1910), photographer
- Charles Méryon (1821–1868), printmaker (etching)
- Rosa Bonheur (1822–1899), painter
- Marie Adrien Persac (1823–?), painter, cartographer, architect, civil engineer, photographer
- Alexandre Cabanel (1823–1889), painter
- Albert-Ernest Carrier-Belleuse (1824–1887), sculptor and painter
- Gustave Boulanger (1824–1888), painter
- Jean-Léon Gérôme (1824–1904), painter
- Adolphe Joseph Thomas Monticelli (1824–1886), painter
- Théodule Ribot (1824–1891), painter
- Eugène Boudin (1824–1898), painter
- Pierre Puvis de Chavannes (1824–1898), painter
- William-Adolphe Bouguereau (1825–1905), painter
- Gustave Moreau (1826–1898), painter
- Jean-Baptiste Carpeaux (1827–1875), sculptor
- Elie Delaunay (1828–1891), painter
- Camille Alfred Pabst (1828–1898), painter
- Achille Emperaire (1829–1898), painter and a friend of Paul Cézanne
- Léon Germain Pelouse (1838–1891), painter
- Lucien Joulin (1842–1878), painter
- Gaston de Laperriere (1848–1920), painter
- Gabriel Guay (1848–1923), painter
- Aimé Morot (1850–1915), painter and son in law of Jean-Léon Gérôme
- Gabriel-Charles Deneux (b. 1856), encaustic painter
- Jules-Cyrille Cavé (4 January 1859 – 12 May 1949), painter

== Nineteenth century (Impressionism to Fauvism) ==
See also Modern art, Modernism, Impressionism, Post-Impressionism, Les Nabis, Fauvism, Symbolism, Symbolist painters, Art Nouveau, Primitivism

- Camille Pissarro (1830–1903), painter
- Étienne-Jules Marey (1830–1904), photographer
- Édouard Manet (1832–1883), painter
- Gustave Doré (1832–1883), engraver
- Louis Émile Benassit (1833–1902) artist and raconteur
- Edgar Degas (1834–1917), painter, sculptor
- Pierre Mallet (1836–1898), painter of ceramics
- Henri Fantin-Latour (1836–1904), painter
- Jules Chéret (1836–1932), painter, other media
- Paul Cézanne (1839–1906), painter
- François Salle (1839–1899)
- Odilon Redon (1840–1916), painter, draftsman, lithographer
- Auguste Rodin (1840–1917), sculptor
- Claude Monet (1840–1926), painter; a founder of French Impressionist painting
- Pierre-Auguste Renoir (1841–1919), painter
- Henri-Louis Dupray (1841-1909), painter
- Frédéric Bazille (1841–1870), painter
- Berthe Morisot (1841–1895), painter
- Marie Bracquemond (1841–1916), painter
- Fernand Pelez (1843–1913), painter
- Alexander Louis Leloir (1843–1884), painter
- Henri Rousseau ("Le Douanier Rousseau") (1844–1910), painter
- Jean Antonin Mercié (1845–1916), sculptor
- Jean-Joseph Benjamin-Constant (1845–1902), painter
- Gustave Caillebotte (1848–1894), painter
- Henri Biva (1848–1929), painter
- Jules Bastien-Lepage (1848–1884), painter
- Paul Gauguin (1848–1903), painter, sculptor
- Henry Lerolle (1848–1929), painter
- Eugène Carrière (1849–1906), painter
- Pierre Carrier-Belleuse (1851–1932), painter
- Vincent van Gogh (1853–1890) (Dutch, worked in France), painter
- Charles Angrand (1854–1926), painter
- Emilie Jenny Weyl (1855–1934), sculptor
- Édouard Bisson (1856–1939), painter
- Henry-Edmond Cross (1856–1910), painter
- Henry Moret (1856–1913), painter
- Eugène Atget (Jean-Eugène Auguste Atget) (1857–1927), photographer
- Mathurin Janssaud (1857–1940), painter
- Marie Bashkirtseff (1858–1884), painter and sculptor
- Georges-Pierre Seurat (1859–1891), painter
- Antoine Bourdelle (1861–1929), sculptor
- Aristide Maillol (1861–1944), sculptor
- Louis Vivin (1861–1936), painter
- Antonio de la Gandara (1861–1917), painter
- Gaston Bussière (1862–1929), Symbolism movement painter and illustrator
- Ernest de Chamaillard (1862–1931), painter
- Henri Delavallée (1862–1943), painter
- Paul Signac (1863–1935), painter
- Camille Bouvagne (1864–1936), painter
- René Georges Hermann-Paul (1864–1940), graphic artist, illustrator, painter
- William Didier-Pouget (1864–1959), painter
- Henri Marie de Toulouse-Lautrec (1864–1901), painter
- Paul Sérusier (1864–1927), painter
- Paul Ranson (1864–1909), painter
- Seraphine Louis (1864–1942), painter
- Henri Jourdain (1864–1931), painter, prints or lithographs of landscapes usually by the water
- Albert Aurier (1865–1892), poet, art critic and painter devoted to Symbolism
- Suzanne Valadon (1865–1938), painter
- Félix Vallotton (1865–1925) (Swiss, worked in France), painter, engraver
- Jacqueline Marval (1866–1932), the pseudonym for Marie Josephine Vallet, French painter
- Pierre Bonnard (1867–1947), painter
- Angèle Delasalle (1867–1941, painter, engraver
- Paule Gobillard (1867–1946), painter
- Jeanne Itasse-Broquet (1867–1941), sculptor
- Ker-Xavier Roussel (1867–1944), painter
- Hector Guimard (1867–1942), architect and decorator
- Édouard Vuillard (1868–1940), painter
- Georges Lacombe (1868–1916), sculptor
- Émile Bernard (1868–1941), painter
- Henri Matisse (1869–1954), painter, other media
- Adolf de Meyer (1869–1949), photographer
- Georges d'Espagnat (1870–1950), painter, illustrator, engraver

== Twentieth century (pre-World War II) ==
See also Post-Impressionism, Modern art, Modernism, Cubism, Puteaux Group, Dada, Surrealism, School of Paris

- Maurice Dubois (1869–1944), painter
- Georges Rouault (1871–1958), painter
- Léon Printemps (1871–1945), painter
- František Kupka (1871–1957) (Czech, worked in France), painter
- Henri-Charles Manguin (1874–1943), painter
- Louis Mathieu Verdilhan (1875–1928), painter
- Albert Marquet (1875–1947), painter
- Jacques Villon (1875–1963), painter
- Constantin Brâncuși (1876–1957) (French, born in Romania), sculptor
- Maurice de Vlaminck (1876–1958) (Flemish, worked in France), painter
- Raymond Duchamp-Villon (1876–1918), sculptor
- Raoul Dufy (1877–1953), painter
- Jeanne Baudot (1877–1957), painter
- René Charles Edmond His, (1877–1960), landscape painter
- Jean Crotti (1878–1958) (Swiss), painter
- Louis Marcoussis (Louis Markus) (1878–1941 or 1883–1941) (Polish, worked in France), painter
- Francis Picabia (1879–1953), painter
- Jean-Georges Cornélius (1880-1963), painter
- Maurice Berty (1884–1946), illustrator
- André Derain (1880–1954), painter
- Joseph Hémard (1880–1961), illustrator
- René Béclu (1881—1915), sculptor
- Charles Picart Le Doux (1881—1959), painter
- Albert Gleizes (1881–1952), painter, writer, theorist
- Henri Le Fauconnier (1881–1946), painter
- Jacob Macznik (1905–1945), painter
- Fernand Léger (1881–1955), painter
- Georges Braque (1882–1963), painter
- Auguste Chabaud (1882–1955), painter
- Auguste Herbin (1882–1960), painter
- Jean Metzinger (1883–1956), painter, engraver, poet, writer, theorist
- Marie Laurencin (1883–1956), painter
- Maurice Utrillo (1883–1955), painter
- Marie-Renée Ucciani (1883–1963), painter, sculptor
- Georges Ribemont-Dessaignes (1884–1974), painter
- Jacques Maroger (1884–1962), painter
- Robert Delaunay (1885–1941), painter
- André Dunoyer de Segonzac (1884–1974), painter
- Raymond Wintz (1884–1956), painter
- Pierre Brissaud (1885–1964), painter
- Roger de La Fresnaye (1885–1925), painter
- Robert Antoine Pinchon (1886–1943), French Post-Impressionist painter of the Rouen School (l'École de Rouen)
- Amédée Ozenfant (1886–1956), painter
- Jean (Hans) Arp (1886–1966), painter, sculptor
- Marc Chagall (1887–1985) (born in Belarus), painter
- Marcel Duchamp (1887–1968), painter, sculptor, other media
- Suzanne Duchamp-Crotti (1889–1963), painter
- Anna Quinquaud (1890–1984), explorer and sculptor
- Ossip Zadkine (1890–1967) (Russian born), sculptor
- Sabine Desvallières (1891–1935), French embroiderer and nun
- Jacques Lipchitz (1891–1973) (born in Lithuania), sculptor
- Max Ernst (1891–1976) (German born), painter, sculptor
- Thérèse Lemoine-Lagron (1891–1949), painter
- Louis Favre (1892–1956), painter, creator of lithographs
- Bram van Velde (1892–1981) (Dutch, worked in France), painter
- Chaïm Soutine (1894–1943) (born in Belarus), painter
- Jacques Henri Lartigue (1894–1986), photographer
- Jean Maurice Rothschild (1902–1998), furniture artist, interior designer, muralist
- Gen Paul (1895–1975), painter, engraver
- Albert Gilles (1895–1979), metal embosser, working with copper
- Lucie Bouniol (1896–1988), sculptor, painter
- André Masson (1896–1987), painter
- René Iché (1897–1954), sculptor, painter
- Abraham Mintchine (1898-1931), painter
- Jean Fautrier (1898–1964), painter
- Georges Gimel (1898–1962), painter, engraver, sculptor
- Henri Michaux (1899–1984) (Belgian), painter
- Brassaï (Gyula Halasz) (1899–1984) (born in Hungary), photographer
- Yves Tanguy (1900–1955) (naturalized American), painter

== Twentieth century (post-World War II) ==
- Alexandre Frenel (1899-1981), painter and sculptor
- René Pellos (1900–1998), cartoonist
- Madeleine Schlumberger or Marie d’Ailleurs’ (1900–1980), artist, writer
- Marcelle Bergerol (1901–1989), painter
- Michel-Marie Poulain (]1906–1991), painter
- Alberto Giacometti (1901–1966) (Swiss, worked in Paris), sculptor, painter
- Alfred-Georges Regner (1901–1987), painter, engraver
- Jean Dubuffet (1901–1985), painter
- Charles Cobelle (1902–1994), painter
- Hans Bellmer (1902–1975) (French, born in Germany), sculptor, photographer, engraver
- Victor Brauner (1903–1966) (Romanian), painter
- Hans Hartung (1904–1989) (born in Germany), painter
- Jean Hélion (1904–1987), painter
- Pierre Tal-Coat (1905–1985), painter
- Elisa Breton (1906–2000), artist and writer, third wife of French writer and surrealist André Breton
- Henri Cadiou (1906–1989), painter
- Victor Vasarely (1908–1997) (born in Hungary), painter
- Balthus (Balthasar Klossowski de Rola, called "Balthus") (1908–2001) (Polish born), painter
- Mario Tauzin (1909–1979)
- Andrée Bordeaux-Le Pecq (1910–1973), illustrator
- Jacques Nathan Garamond (1910–2001), graphic designer, illustrator, painter
- Lucien Hervé (László Elkán) (1910–2007) (born in Hungary), photographer
- Othello Radou (1910–2006), painter
- Louise Bourgeois (1911–2010) (lived and died in America), sculptor, other media
- Ervin Marton (1912–1968), photographer and artist
- Wols (1913–1951) (born in Germany), painter
- Pierre Wemaëre (1913–2010), painter
- Etienne Martin (1913–1995), sculptor
- Nicolas de Staël (1914–1955) (French, Russian origin), painter
- Gérard Locardi (1915–1998), painter
- François Lanzi (1916–1988), painter
- Constantine Andreou (1917–2007) (Greek, Brazilian born), painter, sculptor
- Marcel Mouly (1918–2008), painter, print maker
- Bernard Cathelin (1919–2004), painter
- Maurice Boitel (1919–2007), painter
- Pierre Soulages (1919–2022), painter
- Gabrielle Bellocq (1920–1999), painter
- César Baldaccini (called "César") (1921–1998), sculptor
- Claude Bonin-Pissarro (1921–2021), painter
- Georges Mathieu (1921–2012), painter
- Francois Fiedler (1921–2001), painter
- Simon Hantaï (1922–2018) (born in Hungary), painter
- Paul Crotto (1922–2016), painter, sculptor and printmaker
- François Ozenda (1923–1976), painter
- Jean Tinguely (1925–1991) (Swiss), sculptor
- Robert Filliou (1926–1987), other media
- Raymond Hains (1926–2005), other media
- Paul Rebeyrolle (1926–2005), painter
- François Morellet (1926–2016), painter
- Jacques de la Villeglé (1926–2022), other media (ripped posters)
- François Dilasser (1926–2012), painter
- Georges Badin (1927–2014), painter
- Bernard Buffet (1928–1999), painter
- Yves Klein (1928–1962), painter
- Jacques Rivette (1928–2016), filmmaker
- Arman (Armand Fernandez) (1928–2005), sculptor
- Natalie d'Arbeloff (1929–), cartoonist and painter
- Gérard Gasiorowski (1930–1986), painter, other media
- Niki de Saint-Phalle (1930–2002), sculptor
- Alvaro Guillot (1931–2010) (Uruguay/French, died in Santa Fe, New Mexico), abstract realism
- Jules Michel (1931–), painter, sculptor
- Tomi Ungerer (1931–2019), artist, illustrator
- Bernard Rancillac (1931–2021), painter, sculptor
- Jean-Marie Straub (1933–2022) and Danièle Huillet (1936–2006), filmmakers
- Lydia Corbett (1934–), artist
- Jean Pierre Serrier (1934–1989), painter
- Jean-Pierre Yvaral (1934–2002) (son of Victor Vasarely), painter
- Jean-Michel Sanejouand (1934–2021), sculptor, painter
- Silviane Léger (1935–2012), French sculptor
- Ben Vautier (called "Ben") (1935–), painter, other media
- Martial Raysse (1936–), painter
- Daniel Buren (1938–), sculptor, painter
- Pierre Laffillé (1938–2011), painter
- Henri Sert (1938–1964), painter
- Gérard Fromanger (1939–2021), painter, other media
- Sandra Jayat (c.1939–), painter, poet, author
- Sylvie Selig (born 1941), painter, illustrator, sculptor
- Nancy Wilson-Pajic (1941–), media artist, feminist artist, installation artist, photographer
- Bernar Venet (1941–) (lives in America), sculptor
- Daniel Dezeuze (1942–), other media
- Anne Poirier (1942–), painter, other media
- Ksenia Milicevic (1942–), painter
- Tania Mouraud (1942–), contemporary artist
- Jean Jacques Surian (1942–), painter and ceramist, lives in Marseilles
- Patrick Bokanowski (1943–), filmmaker
- Pierre Risch (1943–), painter, lithograph, engraver, designer, pastellist, watercolorist
- Slobodan Pajic (1943–), painter, media artist, installation artist
- René-Louis Baron (1944–2016), conceptualist, algorithmic music composer
- Christian Boltanski (1944–2021), painter, photographer, other media, sculptor
- Reine Mazoyer, (1944–), painter, illustrator, set designer
- Jacques Pellegrin (1944–2021), painter
- Henri Richelet (1944–2020), painter
- Thierry Agullo (1945–1980), mixed media
- Jean-Yves Lechevallier (1946–), sculptor
- Gérard Garouste (1946–), sculptor, painter, other media
- Jean-Marie Poumeyrol (1946–), painter
- Denis Schneider (1946–), painter
- Yves Hayat (1946–), painter
- Orlan (1947–), performance artist, body artist
- Champion Métadier (1947–), visual artist
- Bracha L. Ettinger (1948–) (born in Tel Aviv), painter, photographer, new media, artists' books
- Thibaut de Reimpré (1949–2023), abstract painter
- Claude-Max Lochu (1951–), painter
- Pierre Toutain-Dorbec (1951–), painter, sculptor, photographer, writer
- Guillerm Zamor (1951–), painter, sculptor, writer
- Jean-Marc Bustamante (1952–), painter, sculptor, photographer
- Hélène Agofroy (1953–), contemporary artist
- Thierry Bisch (1953–), painter
- Bernard Frize (1954–), painter
- Michel Mimran (1954–)
- Jean Paul Leon (1955–), painter, sculptor, writer
- Joel Ducorroy (1955–), licence plate artist
- Patrick Moya (1955–), painter, sculptor, media artist (see fr:Patrick Moya)
- Patrick Mimran (1956–), multimedia artist
- Michel De Caso (1956–), painter, sculptor
- Éric Corne (1957–), painter, author, curator, artistic director
- Robert Combas (1957–), painter
- Maurice Benayoun (a.k.a. MoBen) (1957–), media artist
- Pascal Lecocq (1958–) painter, set designer
- Emmanuel Flipo (1958–), painter
- Thierry Noir (1958–), artist and muralist
- Hervé Di Rosa (1959–), painter
- Zaven Paré (1961–), new media artist
- Pierre Huyghe (1962–), media, film, video
- Bibi (1964–), installation artist
- Damien Valero (1965–), mixed media artist
- Marie Jaffredo (1966–), comics creator
- Manu Farrarons (1967–), tattoo artist, graphic designer, illustrator, other media
- Lionel Estève (1967–), (lives and works in Brussels), sculpture and installation artist
- Phil. Macquet (1967–), painter
- Johanna Schipper (known as "Johanna"; 1967–), bande dessinée artist
- Béatrice Cussol (1970–), watercolor, drawing, mural
- Elsa Dax (1972–), painter
- Béatrice Tillier (1972–), illustrator and bande dessinée cartoonist
- Virginie Augustin (1973–), comics and animated features artist
- Jean-François Batellier (1974–), caricaturist and cartoonist
- Abdelkader Benchamma (1975–), drawings, sculptor
- Morgane Tschiember (1976–), sculptor, video artist
- Y Liver (1977–) (lives and works in Paris), video maker and performance artists
- Thomas Canto (1979–), contemporary artist known for his geometric and architectural interventions
- Aude Massot (1983–), comic book artist
- Oriane Lassus (1987–), cartoonist and illustrator
- Seb Toussaint (1988–), artist and muralist
- Jisbar (1989–), artist and painter
- Youssef Tabti, concept artist

== French photographers ==
- Eugène Atget (Jean-Eugène Auguste Atget) (1857–1927)
- Brassaï (Gyula Halasz) (1899–1984) (born in Hungary)
- Hippolyte Bayard (1807–1887)
- Adeline Boutain (1862–1946), photographer, postcard publisher
- Adolphe Braun (1812–1877)
- Alexandra Boulat (1962–2007), photographer
- Sophie Calle (1953–), other media, photographer
- Henri Cartier-Bresson (1908–2004)
- Louis-Jacques Daguerre (1787–1851)
- Robert Doisneau (1912–1994)
- Pierre Dubreuil (1872–1944), photographer
- Philippe Echaroux (1983–)
- Lucien Hervé (László Elkán) (1910–2007), photographer (born in Hungary)
- Jacques Henri Lartigue (1894–1986)
- Ange Leccia (1952–), photographer, filmmaker
- Jean-François Lepage (1960–), photographer
- Étienne-Jules Marey (1830–1904)
- Charles Marville (1816–1879)
- Nadar (Gaspard Félix Tournachon, called "Nadar") (1820–1910)
- Joseph Nicéphore Niépce (1765–1833), inventor of photography
- Pierre et Gilles (Pierre: 1949, Gilles: 1953), photographers (active since 1976)
- Michel Poivert (1965–), photography historian, president of Société française de photographie
- Herman Puig (originally from Cuba), photographer, filmmaker
- Constant Puyo (1857–1933)
- Marc Riboud (1923–2016), photographer
- Georges Rousse (1947–), photographer
- Bettina Rheims (1952–), photographer
- Willy Ronis (1910–2009), photographer
- Lise Sarfati (1958–), photographer
- Jean-Louis Schoellkopf (1946–), photographer
- Alex Strohl (1989–)
- Jean-Baptiste Tournassoud (1866–1951), photographer and military officer
- Pierre Toutain-Dorbec (1951–)
- Xavier Veilhan (1963–), photographer, other media
- Jean-Marie Villard (1828–1899)
- Wols (Alfred Otto Wolfgang Schulze) (1913–1951) (German, worked in France), photographer

== See also ==
- Art history
- French art
- European art history
- History of painting
- List of French painters
