= Locardi =

Locardi is an Italian surname. Notable people with the surname include:

- Elia Locardi (born 1980), American photographer
- Gérard Locardi (1915–1998), French painter

== See also ==
- Locard, surname
