= Locard =

Locard is a surname. Notable people with the surname include:

- Arnould Locard (1841–1904), French malacologist
- Edmond Locard (1877–1966), French forensic scientist
  - Locard's exchange principle, developed by Edmond Locard
- Sir Simon Locard, 2nd of Lee (1300–1371), Scottish knight

== See also ==
- Locardi, surname
