= Y Liver =

Paris-based art duo

Y Liver was a Paris-based contemporary art duo created in 1999 by David Liver (born in 1977 in Le Havre) and Rugiada Cadoni (born in 1977 in Italy). They ended their collaboration in 2013.

== Biography ==
After receiving their diplomas from Brera Milan School of Fine Arts in 2003, they settled in Paris.

They have participated in several group exhibitions across Europe, including the inaugural Prague Biennale in 2003, the Nuit Blanche in Paris in 2004, and the 11th Venice Architecture Biennale in 2008, where they were invited by the international group Com.plot.system, to present a project in the Venezuela Pavilion. In this occasion David Liver performed "Venice, David Liver eating pickles by the Ghetto", a performative phone piece.

Their first real solo exhibition was in Rome in 2001, at the Pino Casagrande Studio, in which Y Liver closed off the exhibition space while letting the public wait in the hall of the gallery. In 2007 they collaborated with the stylist Antonio Marras, known for being the director of the Kenzo house. Together they produced a performance that will be filmed, and they signed a tallit (Jewish prayer shawl) that was shown in Berlin in 2008.

It was in Berlin at Bimal Projects that their exhibition "Dein Jude" aroused the concern of passersby, shocked by the large Jewish star painted in broad daylight by David on the window looking out onto Zimmerstrasse, across from the old Gestapo headquarters. The intervention of the police raised the curiosity of the press, and vandalism became the subject of a conference-performance held in collaboration with the philosopher Otto Kallscheuer.

=== Post-Duo activity ===
Following the dissolution of the duo in 2013, David Liver pursued an independent practice, expanding into editorial, curatorial, and conceptual projects. He has contributed to or initiated several cultural platforms, including Voice Over Magazine, a critical publication intended as a nodal space for politically engaged artists and thinkers to address the field of political institutions directly, initially supported by the Council of Europe. From 2011 to 2024, he was involved in E il Topo, an artist-run editorial experiment, published Intramural Sports, a poetry book co-written with Aliah Rosenthal, and with art by chinese artist Ai Weiwei. In 2024 he co-directed The Other Session with Michael Kaethler, an initiative that aims to rethink cultural diplomacy through alternative research models.
