= Jeanne Baudot =

French painter

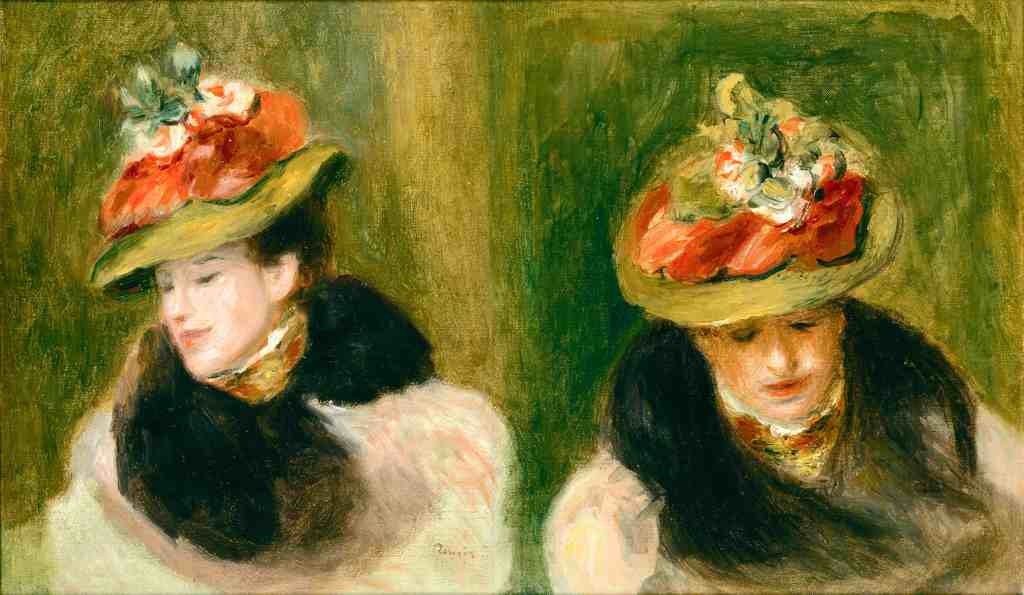
Pierre-Auguste Renoir, Portrait de Jeanne Baudot de trois-quarts et de face, 1896.

Jeanne Baudot (French pronunciation: [ʒan bodo]; 11 May 1877 in Courbevoie – 27 June 1957 in Louveciennes) was a French painter.

== Life ==
Jeanne Baudot's father, Emile, was the doctor to French artist Auguste Renoir's relatives when they lived in Louveciennes.

In 1893, she met Auguste Renoir through her cousin Paul Gallimard, an art collector.

"She was sixteen years old, was the daughter of the senior doctor of Compagnie des chemins de fer de l'Ouest, and, to the great astonishment of her parents who felt like hens having hatched a duck, she painted and admired Renoir." — Jean Renoir, Pierre-Auguste Renoir, mon père.

From 1897 to 1914, she lived at 4, Rue du Général Leclerc in Louveciennes, where Renoir had his workshop.

She became the godmother of Auguste Renoir's second son, Jean Renoir, at the Saint-Pierre de Montmartre church, while Georges Durand-Ruel was the godfather. Throughout her life she stayed close to Jean Renoir, who became a film director. He wrote the preface of the exhibition catalogue of her retrospective in 1960 at Galerie Durand-Ruel.

Auguste Renoir painted several portraits of Jeanne Baudot.

Maurice Denis painted Auguste Renoir and Miss Jeanne Baudot in 1906.

Jeanne Baudot was a childhood friend of painter Julie Manet, the daughter of Berthe Morisot and Eugène Manet, and appears in many instances of Manet's diary.

Her name was given to a street in Louveciennes.

== Work ==
Jeanne Baudot painted portraits, landscapes and still-lifes.

The only true student of Auguste Renoir, she painted under his direct supervision. She notably painted the flowers and landscapes of Louveciennes and Marly.

She travelled to North Africa in the early twentieth century, which resulted in picturesque and lighter works.

In 1949, Jeanne Baudot wrote Renoir, ses amis, ses modèles, Paris: Éditions Littéraires de France, 137 p. (notice BnF n^{o} FRBNF31774635).

== Exhibitions ==
- 1966, Paris, Galerie Durand-Ruel, Dame & Demoiselles – Blanche Hoschedé, Jeanne Baudot, Paule Gobillard, from June 16 to July 29, 1966.
- 1960, Paris, Galerie Durand-Ruel, Rétrospective Jeanne Baudot. 1877-1957, from January 23 to February 13, 1960.
- 1950, Paris, Galerie Durand-Ruel, from April 28 to May 15, 1950.
- 1930, Paris, Galerie Dru, from November to December 1930.
- 1925, Paris, Salon des Tuileries.
- 1906, Paris, Salon des indépendants.
- 1905, Paris, Salon d'Automne.
