= Philippe Echaroux =

French photographer and street artist

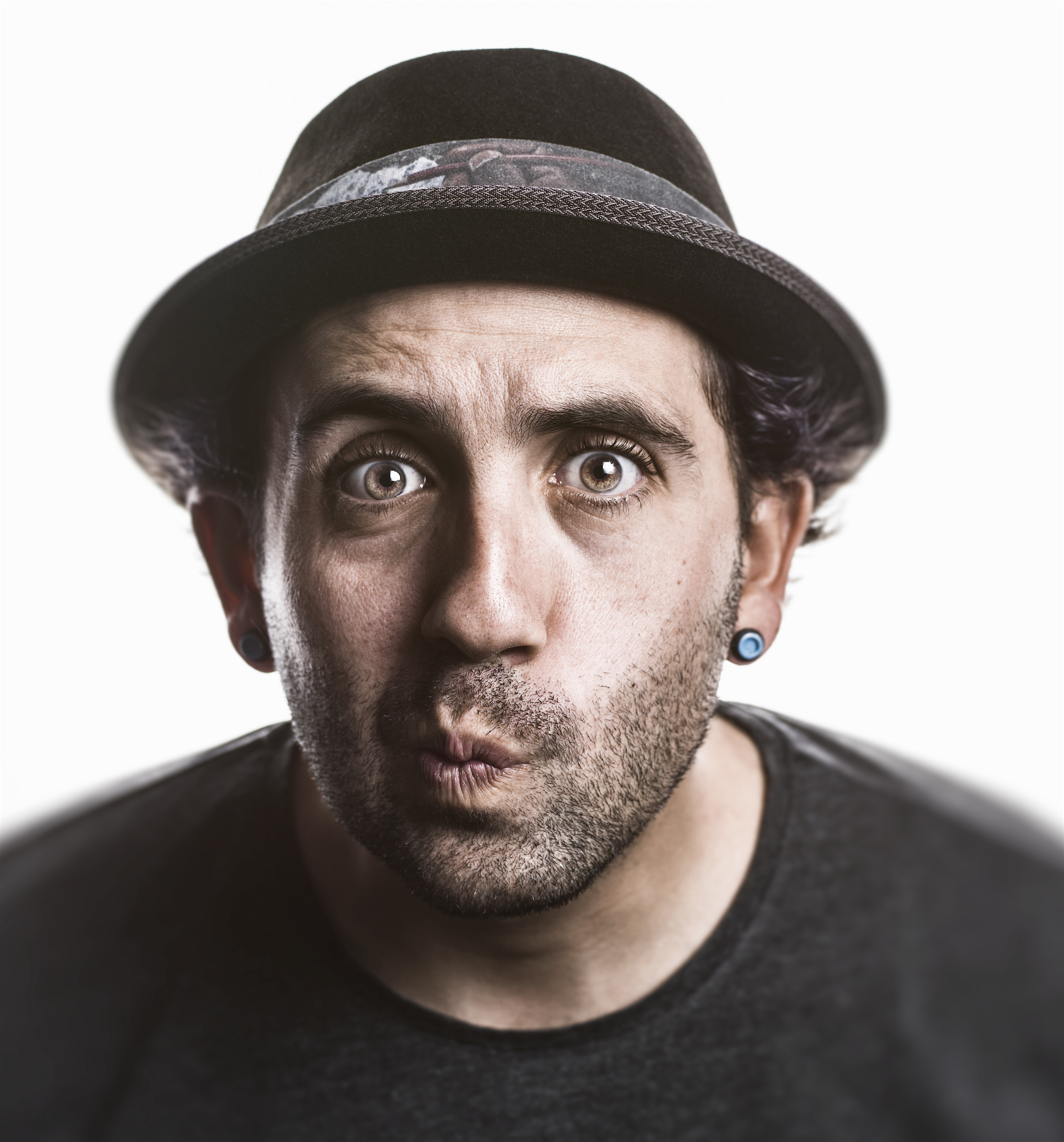
- Autoportrait
- Born: 26 June 1983 (age 43); Marseille, France
- Awards: The international DIOR Competition Award for Photography
- Scientific career
- Fields: Photography

Notes
- inventor of concept Street Art 2.0

Philippe Echaroux (born 1983) is a French photographer and street artist. He projects his portraits at a large scale, calling them "Street Art 2.0".

== Photography career ==
Echaroux is a portrait photographer. He holds a diploma as a specialist educator. He specialises in less than one minute celebrity portraitures. He has photographed celebrities Zinedine Zidane, Jonny Wilkinson, Gary Dourdan, and Fatboy Slim. He made the last portrait of the footballer Johan Cruyff.

Since 2014 he has projected his portraits at a large scale, in site-specific exhibitions, calling them "Street Art 2.0". In 2015 he made an intervention during the Contemporary Art Bienale in La Havane, Cuba. In 2016, Echaroux premiered his work in the rainforest in Amazonia.

Echaroux spoke at a local TEDx Marseille conference in October 2016.

== Awards ==
- 2008: International Dior Competition Award for Photography

== Publications ==
- Gueules du Rugby: Qu'est-ce qu'elles ont nos Gueules ?. 2JP, 2015. ISBN 9782746680616.

== Gallery ==
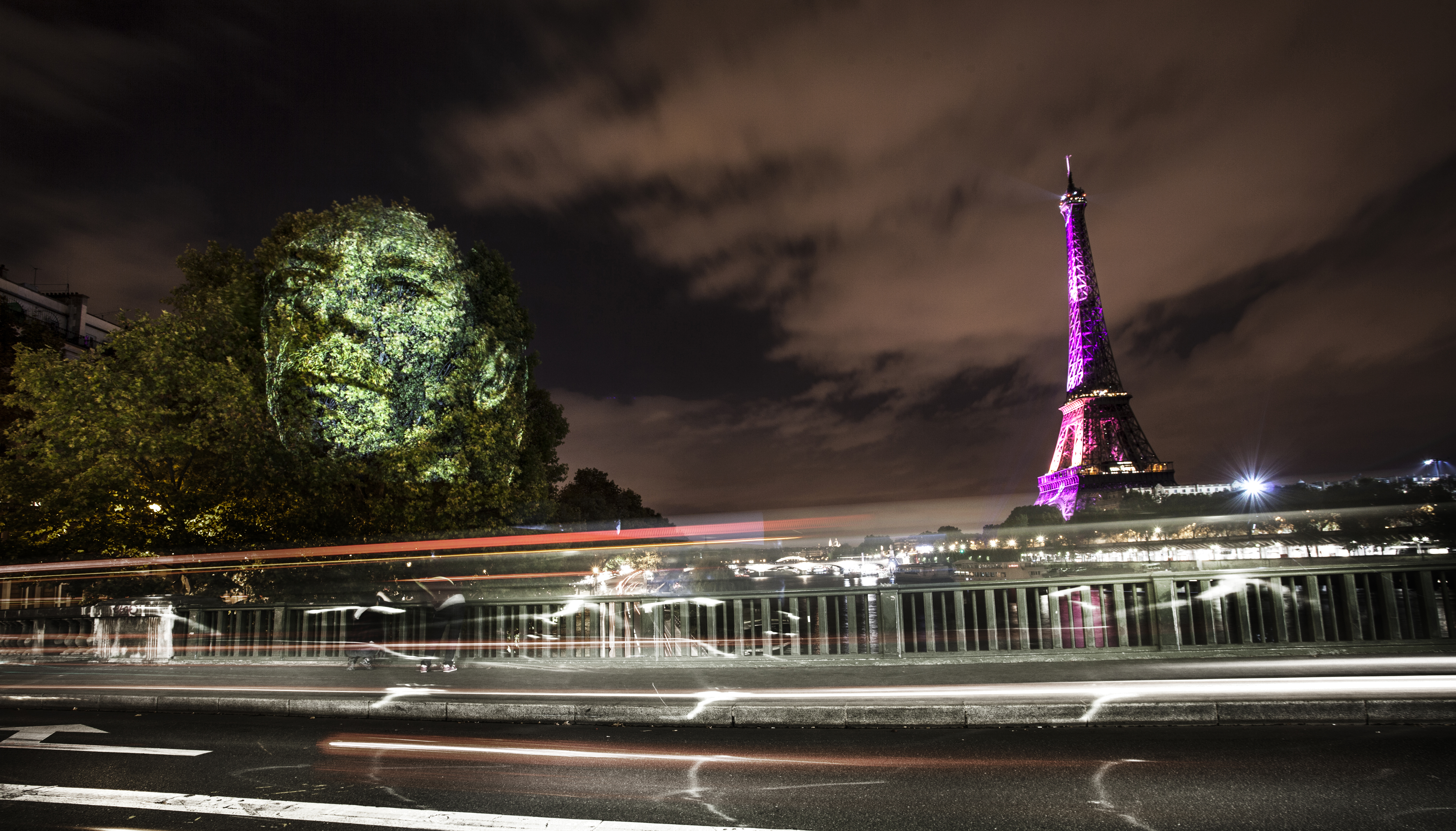

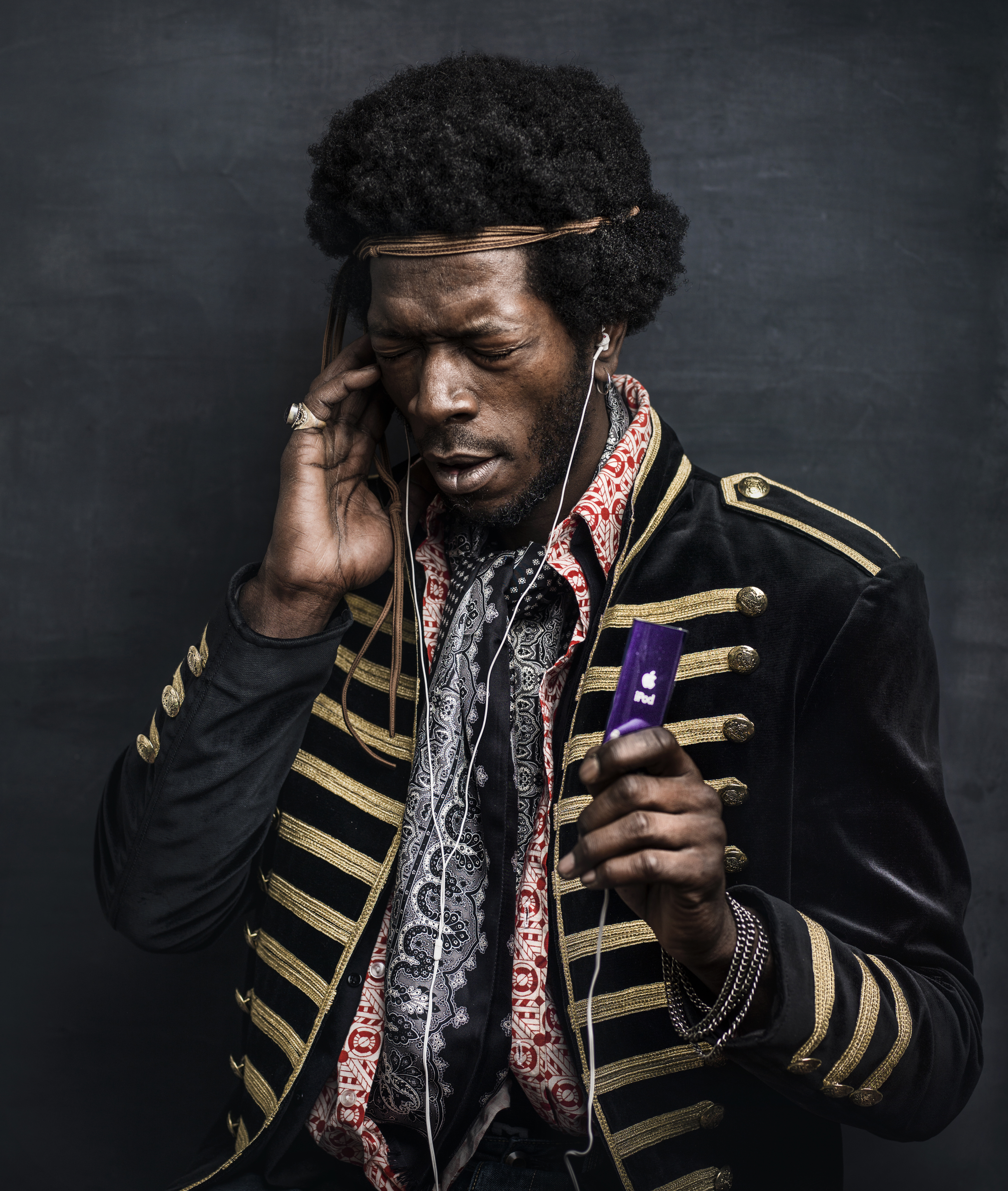
