= Alex Strohl =

French-American photographer and author (born 1989)

- Pierre-Alexandre Strohl
- Born: 5 July 1989 (age 37); Madrid, Spain
- Occupation: Photographer
- Notable work: Alternative Living (2015)
- Style: Natural beauty, Travel
- Spouse: Andrea Dabene
- Family: Family Strohl

Alex Strohl (born 5 September 1989) is a French-American photographer and author, best known for his landscape and outdoor photography. Strohl is based in Whitefish, Montana. In 2018, XXLPIX ranked him in 12th position in the "TOP100 photographers on the web" list (highest new entry). He authored a book named Alternative Living, published by Blurb in 2015.

His works has been featured in publications and magazines such as Forbes, BuzzFeed, Vanity Fair, and Gentleman's Journal.

== Bibliography ==
- Alternative Living (2015) ISBN 978-1388786472
