= René Béclu =

French sculptor

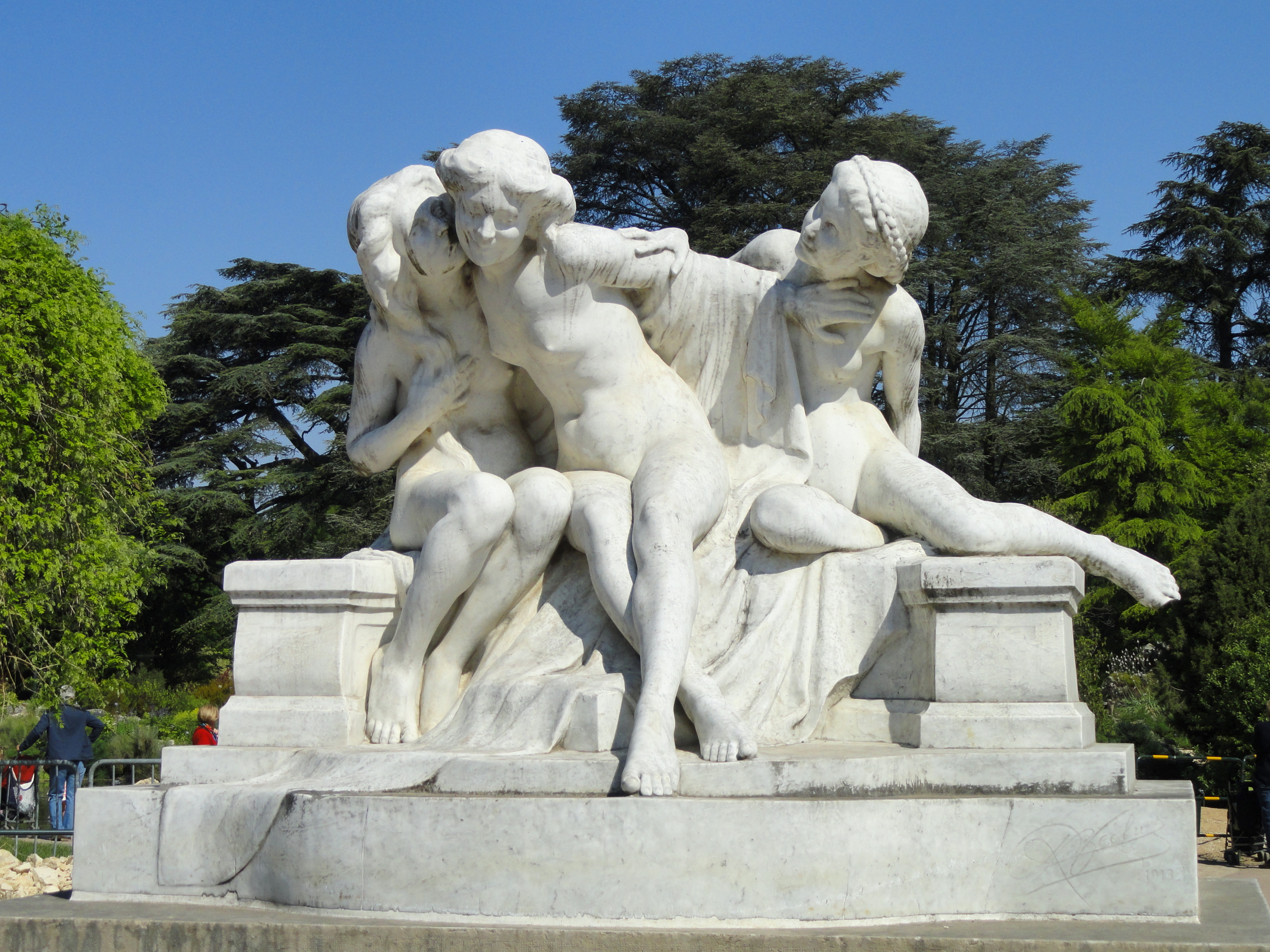
Le Secret (The Secret) in the Parc de la Tête d'Or

René Hippolyte Béclu (3 February 1881, in Paris – 17 January 1915, in Mort pour la France, Riaville (Meuse)) was a French sculptor.

He was born in Paris, studied under Antonin Mercié and Hector Lemaire, and is now best known for his work Le Secret (The Secret) in the Parc de la Tête d'Or, Lyon, France.
