= Pierre Toutain-Dorbec =

French photographer

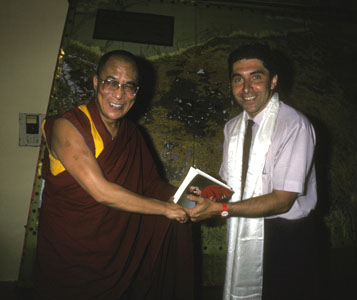
Pierre Toutain-Dorbec with the 14th Dalai Lama

Pierre Toutain-Dorbec, (born 16 April 1951) in Orbec, Normandy, France is a Franco-American photographer, artist, author, and publisher whose work emphasizes a humanist perspective.

== Biography ==
Pierre grew up in Orbec, Normandy, and Paris. His family moved between Paris and Orbec to accommodate Pierre's education and his mother's career. His artistic education began within his family; his parents provided instruction in traditional techniques in drawing, painting, and sculpting. His grandfather, Gabriel, was a photographer during World War I and his uncle Jean was also a photographer and artist. Pierre's father, Jacques, was a known textile expert and designer, and later a painter. His mother, Francoise Fontaine, was a professional musician and opera singer. From his uncle, Pierre received instruction in photography and film development. Toutain-Dorbec was influenced by his grandparents' neighbor, the French figurative painter Pierre Laffille (French, 1938–2012), who remained a life-time friend. At age 16, Toutain-Dorbec attended the Atelier de la Grande-Chaumiere, a renowned art school in Paris, where he received a classical education in fine art. While attending art school, Toutain-Dorbec supplemented his art education working as an assistant with the acclaimed German photographer Wilhem Maywald, who resided near the school.

By the end of 1968, with the encouragement of his family Toutain-Dorbec left home to pursue a career as a photographer. He began his career as photographer in Vietnam. From 1968 to 1995 Pierre worked as a war correspondent, for both Gamma and Sygma press agencies, and as a freelance photographer. His work focused mainly on Southeast Asia and North Africa. He covered his time in Vietnam and Cambodia with the Khmer Rouge (a collection of those photos are archived at Rutgers University). While in Burma he covered the problems of guerrillas fighting the government, like the Karen. Toutain-Dorbec worked to draw attention to the problems of child abuse and child prostitution in Southeast Asia, and problematic laws which could result in children being incarcerated alongside their fathers. He paid particular attention to issues associated with illicit drugs, especially heroin. Toutain-Dorbec advocated the importance of fair judicial treatment for foreigner in the courts. He worked for two years in Morocco from 1978 to 1979 for the King, photographing then-Crown Prince Sidi Mohammed and further documenting Morocco. King Hassan II has a large collection of his photographs. In India, he worked extensively on fiction regarding leprosy, religion and ancient cities. Toutain-Dorbec lived and worked with the Dalai Lama in 1983–84, co-authoring two books with him. He also photographed old French traditions going back to the Middle Age (some of the stories are now part of museum collections, like the Musée des Traditions in Louviers, Normandy). He also worked for the movie industry.

From 1995 to 2003, Toutain-Dorbec lived in France and Spain where he pursued personal projects, primarily sculpture and photography. In 2002, he became the director and curator of the International Museum for Photography, located in the ancient Chateau de Belcastel; Toutain-Dorbec has received acclaim for his work in this capacity. In 2004, he moved to New Mexico commencing a project documenting the United States. Currently, he lives in Cannon Beach, Oregon, where he and his wife Claudia operate the Cannon Beach Hotel.

== Artistic Work ==
Following his artistic urges from an early age, Pierre Toutain-Dorbec photographed and drew his family and his native countryside, Normandy. Throughout his career, Toutain-Dorbec's photographic work has remained true to his original training. His photographs are primarily black and white, taken on traditional film. He maintains his own darkroom where he processes his film and silver gelatins himself. Toutain-Dorbec so far has published over forty books and exhibited his photographs, drawings, sculptures, and paintings throughout Asia, Europe, America, and North Africa.

== Works ==
=== Bibliography ===
- "Normandie", Editions Dorbec, France, 1976.
- "Confréries de Charité", Editions Dorbec, France, 1976.
- "Thailand", Sawadee Publishing, Bangkok, 1977.
- "Chiang-Mai", Sawadee Publishing, Bangkok, 1978.
- "Des guerres et des enfants", self-published, Rabat, 1978.
- "Maroc", Editions Photo 2000, Rabat, 1979.
- "Fantasia", Editions Photo 2000, Rabat, 1979.
- "Atlas", Editions Photo 2000, Rabat, 1979.
- "Phuket", Sawadee Publishing, Bangkok, 1980.
- "Opera", Sawasee Publishing, Bangkok, 1980.
- "Wat Pra Keo", Sawasee Publishing, Bangkok, 1980.
- "Rien que la Guerre, et Toi", Editions Rachid Asnaoui, Casablanca, 1981.
- "Une brève histoire du Maroc", Editions Rachid Asnaoui, Casablanca, 1982.
- "Bénarès", Editions Richer/Vilo, Paris, 1985; ISBN 2-901151-17-5.
- "Bénarès", Editions BNP, Paris, 1985.
- "Thaïlande", Editions Temps de Pose, Paris, 1986.
- "Cambodge", self-published, India, 1986.
- "South-East Asia", self-published, India, 1986.
- "Nepal", Editions Temps de Pose, Paris, 1986; ISBN 2-906063-00-2.
  - Merehurst Press, London, 1986.
  - UBS Publisher's, New Delhi, 1986; ISBN 0-948075-19-8.
- Tibet (photographs by Pierre Toutain-Dorbec, interview with Dalaï Lama, text by Pierre Joffroy). Éditions Temps de Pose, coll. "Destination", Paris, 1986. 128 p.; ISBN 2-906063-05-3.
  - Merehurst Press, London, 1986. ISBN 0-948075-69-4.
  - UBS Publisher's, New Delhi, 1986.
- "Quebec", Editions Temps de Pose, Paris, 1987; ISBN 2-906063-02-9.
  - Merehurst Press, London, 1987; ISBN 0-948075-65-1.
- "Paris", Editions Temps de Pose, Paris, 1987; ISBN 2-906063-04-5.
  - Merehurst Press, London, 1987.
  - UBS Publisher's, New Delhi, 1986.
- Rajasthan (photographs by Pierre Toutain-Dorbec). Harrap Columbus, London, 1988. 128 p.; ISBN 0-7471-0136-1.
  - Editions Temps de Pose, Paris, 1988.
- "Ganga", Ganesha Publishing, Calcutta, 1989.
- "Calcutta", Ganesha Publishing, Calcutta, 1989.
- "Itinéraires", self-published, Nepal, 1989.
- "Sadhu", Ganesha Publishing, Calcutta, 1991.
- "Rien que pour toi", self-published, Benares, 1991.
- Tibet, le toit du monde (photographs and text by Pierre Toutain-Dorbec, preface by Dalaï Lama). Editions Denoel, Paris, 1991. 119 p.; ISBN 2-207-23895-4.
- "Villajoyosa", self-published, Spain, 1992.
- "In Rust I Trust", CSF Publishing, United States, 2011; ISBN 978-0-9802432-3-9.
- "The Mystery of Haystack Rock and the Murder at Cannon Beach Hotel", CSF Publishing, United States, 2015; ISBN 978-1-937487-92-8
- "Strolling in Rome with Claudia", CSF Publishing, United States, 2016; ISBN 978-1-937487-96-6
- "Vārānasī or the Perpetual Negation of Self", CSF Publishing, USA, 2016. ISBN 978-1-937487-95-9
- "BoBo, the Monkey Who Thought He Was a Man", CSF Publishing, USA, 2018. ISBN 978-1-937487-99-7
