= Adeline Boutain =

French photographer and publisher

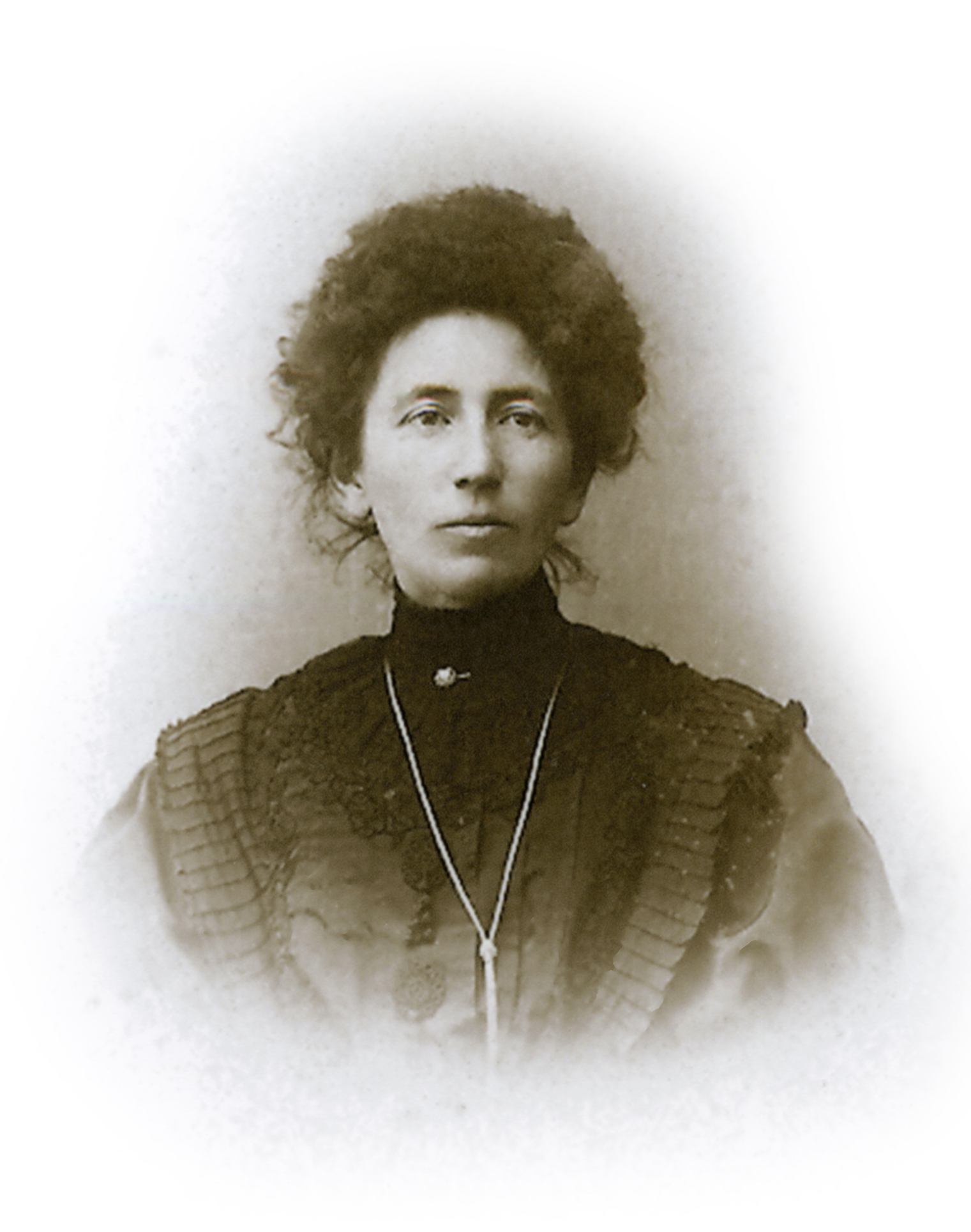
- Born: April 11, 1862; Machecoul, Loire-Atlantique, France
- Died: February 13, 1946 (aged 83); Saint-Gilles-Croix-de-Vie, Pays de la Loire, France
- Occupation: Photographer

Adeline Boutain (11 April 1862 - 13 February 1946) was a French photographer and publisher of postcards.

== Life ==
Boutain was born in Machecoul. She was interested in subjects having to do with her country such as cityscapes, seascapes, street photography, buildings, places of interest, and religious or secular events.

Boutain died at Saint-Gilles-Croix-de-Vie in 1946.

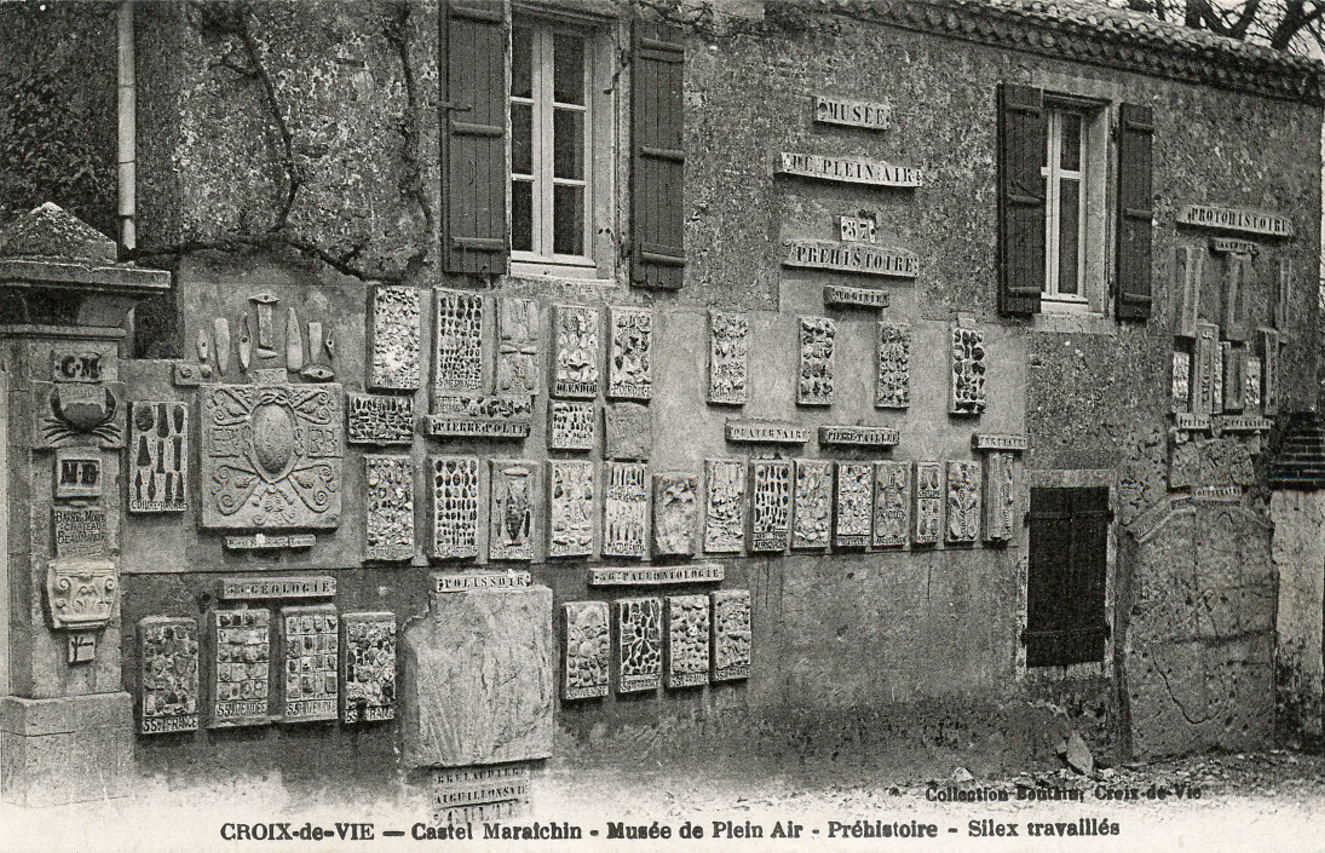
CPA Boutain Castel Maraichin musée plein air

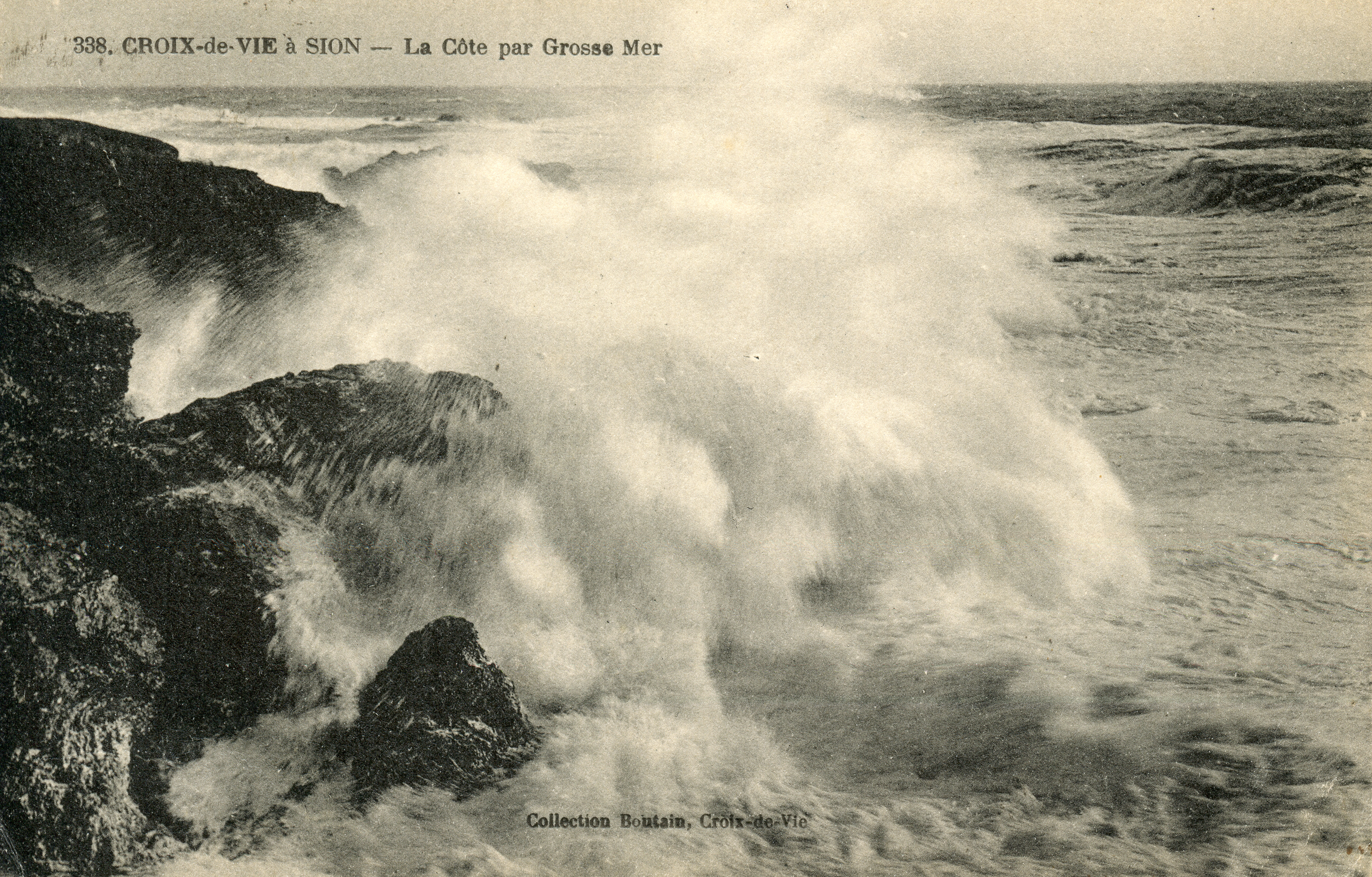
CPA Boutain Sion grosse Mer

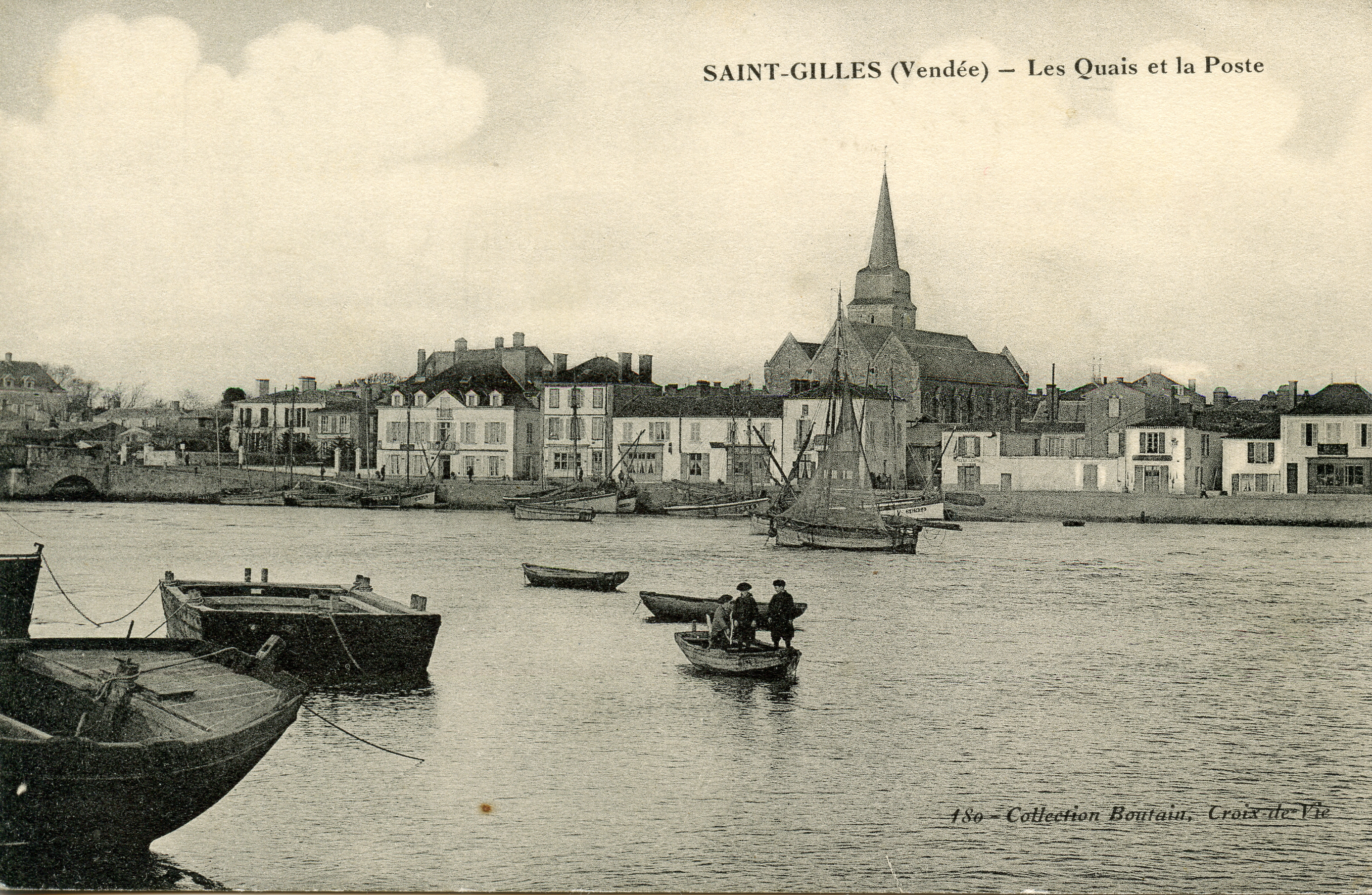
CPA Boutain StGilles Quai

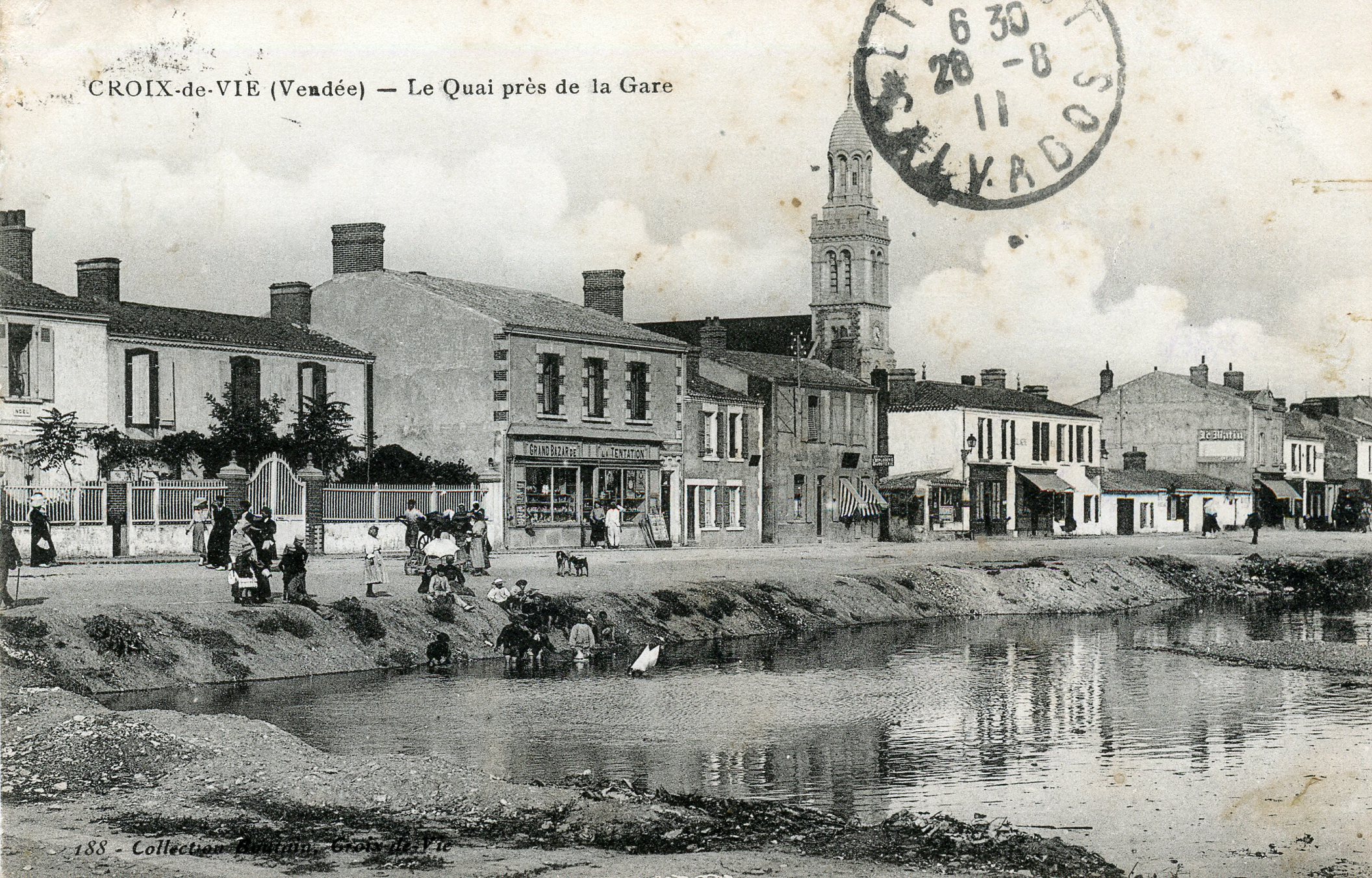
CPA Boutain CroixVie ville
