= Camille de Chantereine =

French artist

Camille de Chantereine (1810–1847) was a French artist. She painted using watercolors and gouache, and was known for her depictions of fruit and flowers. She studied under Pierre-Joseph Redouté.

== Biography ==
Camille de Chantereine was born in Paris. She studied under Pierre-Joseph Redouté. Chantereine made her Salon début in 1827, and won jury medals in 1835 and 1840. In 1936 she started her own course in floral painting.

One of de Chantereine's patrons was Amélie of Leuchtenberg, widow of Pedro I and the former Empress of Brazil.

Camille de Chantereine died in Paris on March 10, 1847.
