= Jean Jacques Surian =

French painter

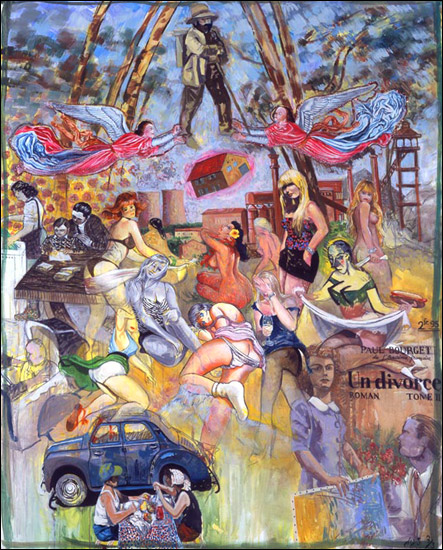
La Vie édifiante de Cézanne, 2005–2006, "Au bord de l'Arc", panel of right-hand side of the triptych of Cézanne, Charcoal, acrylic resin, spangles on canvas, 162 x 130 cm, signed bottom right. Collection of Musées d’Aix-en-Provence, France.

Jean Jacques Surian is a French painter born in 1942 in Marseille. He studied in Marseille and Paris and lives in Marseille. He carried out a lot of exhibitions since its first exposure in Marseille in 1965. He was inspired by the painters of its area, Cézanne, of course, and Vincent Van Gogh, but especially, he kept his freedom, illustrating magnificently that art is initially freedom to do something and to call it art... with the proviso of doing it with talent, inspiration and genius.

Recently it was noticed while exposing in 2004 a series of painting in Aix-en-Provence on the Divine Comedy of Dante (see some examples on fr:Wikipedia) and took part in 2006 in "the Cézanne year" with an exposure to the museum of the tapestries of Aix-en-Provence, where it reinterpreted the work of the Master of Aix, with much of affection, freedom and creative intelligence. The town of Aix en Provence required of him to carry out an earthenware work and high relief in likings with the workshops "Décoramic" and P. Architta, to mark the year Cézanne 2006. It is intended to be installed on a pinion wall of the city in June 2007.

== General references ==
- Art-et-toile
