= Madeleine Schlumberger =

French Artist and Writer

- Born: Madeleine Harth; April 28, 1900; Mulhouse, France
- Died: August 24, 1981 (aged 81); Strasbourg, France

Madeleine Schlumberger or Marie d’Ailleurs’ (28 April 1900 in Alsace – 24 August 1981) was a French artist and writer. She left a vast body of artistic work: paintings or collages, manuscripts and most importantly, miniature theatricalized scenes made up of thousands of antique objects.

Two museums have dedicated one room each to her work:

The Musée Alexis Forel, in Morges, Switzerland inaugurated that room in 2006: It contains the Cabinet of Curiosities, Doll's Houses, Grandmother's Living Rooms, Theatre of Louis II of Bavaria and many other themes. The room at the Musée Paul Delouvrier was inaugurated in 2007: It is located in the modern cathedral of Évry, designed by the architect Mario Botta, near Paris. Some twenty miniature scenes restored or created by the artist are related to popular topics of piety including the Pieta, Bambino, Baroque Church, Carmelite Cells and others.

A good part of her life was spent in Provence.
