= Mathurin Janssaud =

French painter (1857–1940)

Marthurin Janssaud (1857 – 1940) was a French painter.

== Career ==
Janssaud was born in Manosque. Little is known of his early life, other than the fact that he left his home province before the onset of World War I. Like many artists of the day he initially traveled to Paris, yet in time he became more interested in the scenes of Brittany and Concarneau. Here he would enjoy painting vivid ocean scenes and townspeople.

== Description of works ==
Henri Belbeoch comments; “Janssaud’s portrayal of women in their hitched-up skirts, seeking coolness under the stormy sky, demonstrates a certain realism that distinguishes his work from other pastoral scenes favoured by his bourgeois audience. Janssaud gave his public that which he liked to paint.”
