= Pierre Wemaëre =

French artist

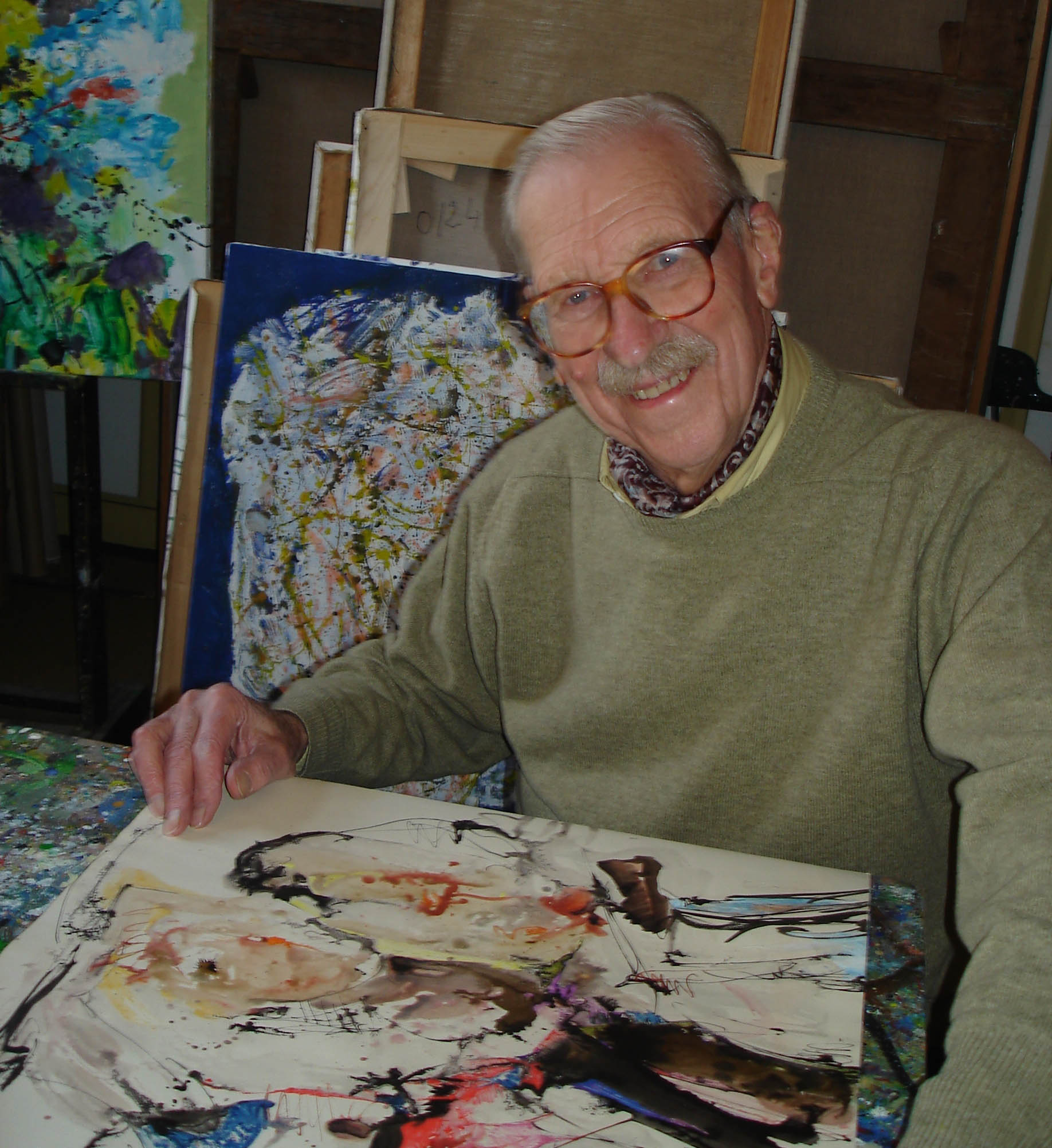
Wemaëre in March 2007

Pierre Wemaëre (October 1, 1913 – January 8, 2010) was a French painter and tapestry designer.

== Biography ==
Wemaëre was born in Comines, France in 1913. Wemaëre was a student in Fernand Léger's Atelier de l'Art Contemporain in the mid 1930s. In the 1940s Wemaëre took up weaving and tapestry design as part of his art practice. He was a long-time friend and collaborator with Asger Jorn, who he had met at Leger's Atelier.

He died in Versailles, France in 2010.

== Collections ==
His work is included in the collections of the Art Institute of Chicago, the National Gallery of Victoria, Melbourne, the Centre Pompidou, Paris and the Tate Museum, London.

His series entitled "double pris" (literally double take"), was produced during the late 1960's into fall 1974. These experimental pieces saw Pierre create 2 artworks of the same subject. The first, was painted with his non-dominant right hand, and the second, the same image, with his dominant hand, but given a self-imposed 3 minute time limit.

His Double Pris collection, while not gaining much collector regard, has proven very popular in the avant guard collector circles.
