= Joël Ducorroy =

French artist

Joel Ducorroy
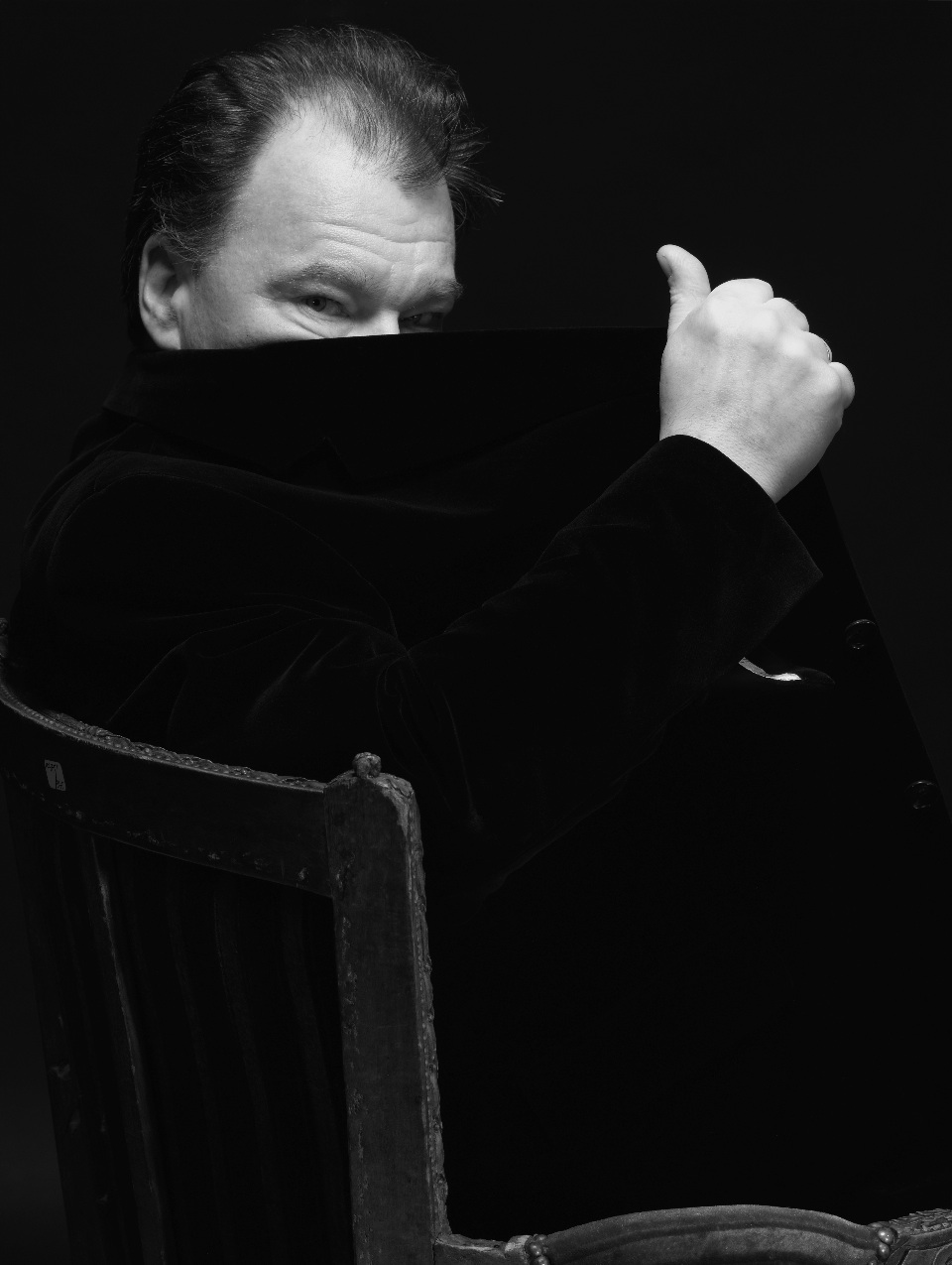
- Born: 1955 (age 70–71)
- Movement: Conceptual art
- Website: joelducorroy.free.fr

Joël Ducorroy (born 1955) is a French "plate artist" (French: "artiste plaquetitien").

== Work ==
Joël Ducorroy's art consists of stamping a word or words onto license plates. Ducorroy uses license plates as a way of breaking away from the traditional canvas and also as a symbol of contemporary life as cars are at the core of our current society. As a conceptual and humoristic artist, Ducorroy translates images into words. Everything is written, nothing is explicit. Describing rather than showing, Ducorroy doesn't dictate his point of view but invites the spectators to create their own image. He exhibits in many places, in France but also in New York City and Tokyo, and works with different galleries in France, especially with Galerie Kahn and Galerie Baudoin Lebon.

== Exhibitions ==
- 1984 Emily Harvey Gallery, New York (United States)
- 1986 Galerie Polaris, Paris (France)
- 1987 Galerie d’Art Contemporain des Musées, Nice (France)
- 1988 Emily Harvey Gallery, New York (USA)
- 1989 Color and/or Monochrome, Tokyo – Kyoto (Japan)
- 1990 "La collection numéro 2", Galerie Polaris, Paris (France)
- 1990 "L’exposition suite", Galerie Métroplolis, Lyon (France)
- 1991 " Immatriculée conception" (9 exhibitions for 10 years of production) : Galerie Jade, Colmar – Galerie G, Besançon – Galerie Polaris, Paris – Galerie Duval – Dunner, Paris – Galerie Lecointre-Ozanne, Paris – Galerie Baudoin Lebon, Paris – Galerie de Paris, Paris – Ghislain Mollet-Vieville agent d’art, Paris – Galerie Lola Gassin, Nice, 1993 Gandy Gallery, Prague, République Tchèque (avec Ben, Jean Dupuy, Olga Adorno, Ducolombier) * (France)
- 1993 Gandy Gallery, Prague (Czech Republic)
- 1996 Galerie Baudoin Lebon, Paris (France)
- 1996 Musée de l'Histoire vivante, Montreuil (France)
- 1998 Centre d’art Bouvet-Ladubay, Saumur (France)
- 1998 Museum of Modern and Contemporary Art, Nice (France)
- 2000 Galerie Kahn, Strasbourg (France)
- 2000 Galerie Baudoin Lebon, Paris (France)
- 2001 Fondation Armando Alvares Penteado, São Paulo (Brazil)
- 2003 "Editions", Galerie Baudoin Lebon, FIAC 2003, Paris (France)
- 2003 Chapelle du Carmel, Châlons–sur-Saône (France)
- 2005 Artcurial, Paris (France)
- 2006 Spicy Gallery, Brussels (Belgium)
- 2007 "L'emploi des mots dans l'art", Musée Museum Départemental, Gap (France)
- 2007 "Hommage de l'auteur", Galerie José Martinez, Lyon (France)
- 2007 "Monaplaque", Galerie Incognito, Monaco
- 2007 Galerie Kandler, Toulouse (France)
- 2008 "Ducorroy sur l'Ile de Ré", Galerie Kahn, Ars-en-Ré (France)
- 2009 "Etre artiste et tout plaquer", Artcurial, Paris / Artaé, Lyon (France)
- 2009 "Edition de Ducorroy", Galerie Appart113, Bordeaux (France)
- 2009 Galerie José Martinez, Lyon (France)
- 2010 "Carminies", Galerie Limitis, Paris (France)
- 2010 "Papillonnages", CACLB, Bureau des forges de Montauban-Buzenol (Luxembourg)
- 2011 "Amicalement vôtre", Galerie Baudoin Lebon, Paris (France)
- 2011 Galerie Kahn, ARTPARIS, Grand Palais, Paris (France)
- 2011 "Plaqué art", Chapelle de la Visitation, Thonon-les-bains (France)

== Installations ==
- 1989 Artist bedroom, Hôtel Windsor, Nice
- 1992 "L’appartement témoin de son temps", Le Confort Moderne, Poitiers (France)
- 2001 "The library", Domaine de Chamarande (France)
- 2002 City hall, Bobigny (France)
- 2006 "Le Pavillon des lettres", Le Channel, Calais (France)
- 2007 "Artbiothérapie " hôpital Necker, Paris (France)

== General references ==
- "Joël Ducorroy – artiste plaquetitien", exhibition at the Museum of modern and contemporary art, NICE, France
- "Joël Ducorroy : Catalogue raisonné – Edition 1/31", Patrick Amine, Critères éditions, 2005
- "Joël Ducorroy : Etre artiste et tout plaquer", Marlène Girardin, Critères éditions, 2008, bilingual French & English
