= Jean-Marie Villard =

French painter

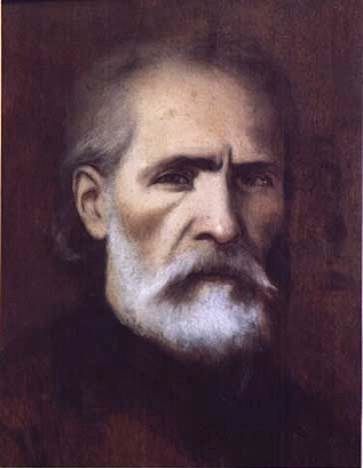
Self-portrait (after 1876)

Jean-Marie Villard (French: [vilaʁ]; 3 January 1828 in Ploaré, Finistère – 16 August 1899 in Ploaré) was a French-Breton painter and photographer.

== Biography ==
His father was a carpenter and contractor, who wanted his son to be an intellectual, but Jean was more interested in drawing with charcoal in the workshop. He attended primary school in Douarnenez and secondary school in Quimper, then enrolled at the Normal School in Rennes.

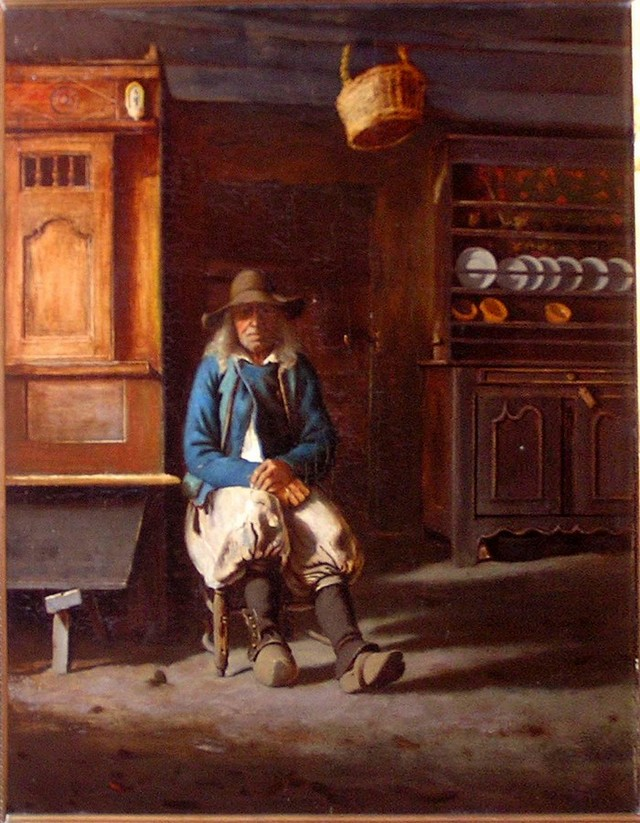
An Old Chouan (possibly his grandfather)

After receiving his teaching certificate, he obtained his first job in Pouldergat in 1847, then became an "Instituteur" in Quimper. Still wishing to be an artist, he took classes with Auguste Goy, a landscape painter who taught at the local college. Goy encouraged him to pursue his career in art, but Villard was soon promoted to a teaching position at the boys' school in Brest. It was there that he began to supplement his salary by doing photography.

A meeting with the photographer Pierre de la Blanchère proved to be decisive. He broke his contract with the school, obtained a declaration of unfitness for military service and followed his new employer to Paris in 1855. Upon arriving, he was introduced to Nadar and the work of Louis Daguerre, and began acquiring some knowledge of chemistry.

While supporting himself with photography, he continued to pursue painting and, by 1864, was a regular exhibitor at the salons. Most of his canvases were landscapes and genre works inspired by his native region, painted during periodic visits to Ploaré.

In 1870, after leaving Paris, he married Alexandrine Flatrès, his brother Joseph's sister-in-law. They had five children, including the writer René Villard and the painter Abel Villard. In 1877, he returned to Quimper to accept what was intended to be a temporary position as a teacher at the college. He remained, however, and eventually taught at several other schools in the area.

He also established a photography workshop there. When his brother Joseph became inspired to take up photography, the workshop was given to him so Jean could devote all his time to painting. Joseph turned the workshop into the "Maison Villard", a publisher of postcards, which have now become collectibles known as the "Collection Villard Quimper".

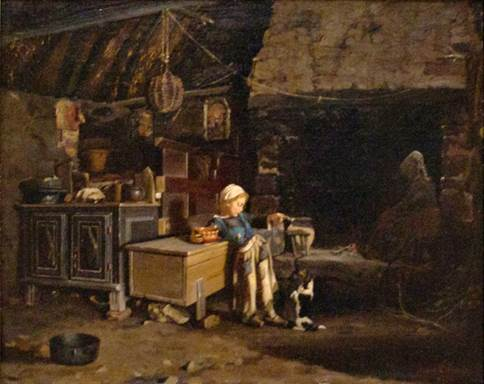
Breton Interior

He had to resign his teaching positions in 1893, after a bout of pneumonia. Recurring lung infections finally weakened his health beyond recovery, and he returned to Ploaré to die.

Abel Villard's son, Robert Paulo Villard (1903-1975), also became a painter.

== Work ==
=== Painting ===
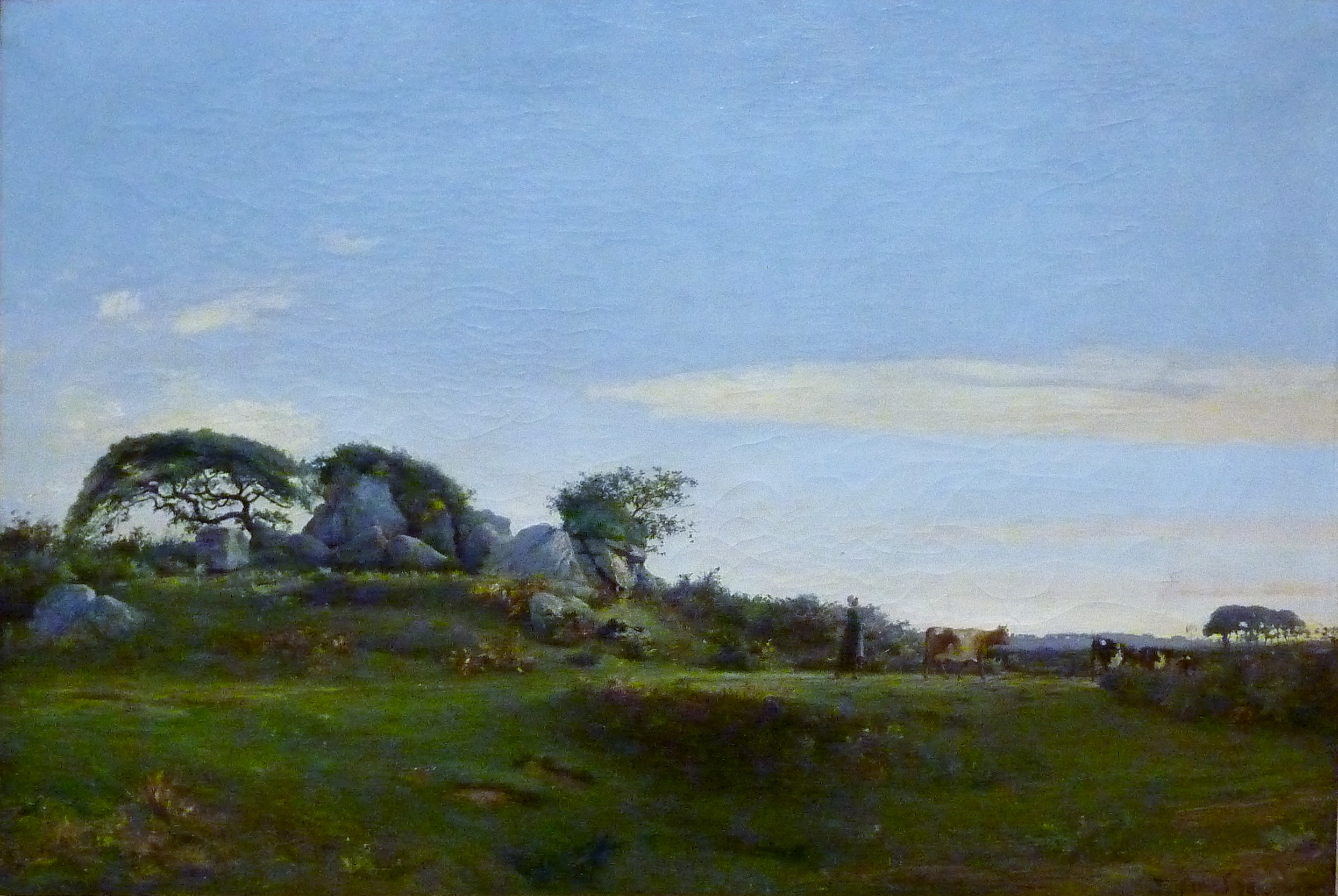
Les Rochers de Kerléguer (1878), Musée des Beaux-Arts de Quimper

- Quimper, Musée des Beaux-Arts de Quimper:
  - Breton Interior, 1870;
  - The Halt, 1877. This painting depicts two riders halting in front of a row of houses where there was an inn and the chapel of Petit-Guélen in Ergué-Armel;
  - Les Rochers de Kerleguer, [near Douarnenez], 1878.

Location unknown

- The Railway Worker, 1885, 70 x 95 cm.
- Woman on the Path to Plomarc'h, 1890, 47 x 31 cm.

== Exhibitions ==
- Salon des artistes français of 1864.
- Jean Marie Villard 1838-1899, town hall of Douarnenez, 1993.

== Critical reception ==
He was a great artist, but they had made him a poor professor.

— Max Jacob
