= Champion Métadier =

French visual artist

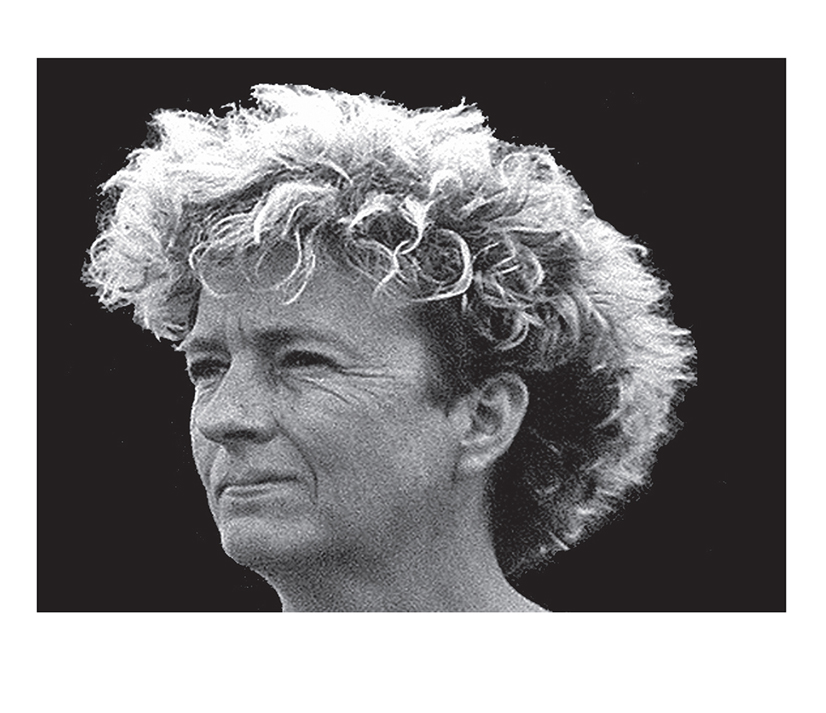
- Born: Isabelle Champion Métadier; 1947 (age 78–79); Tours, France
- Education: College Art and Design Talm in Tours; Beaux-Arts de Paris
- Known for: Visual art

Isabelle Champion Métadier (born 23 June 1947), better known by her artistic name Champion Métadier, is a French visual artist.

== Background ==
Métadier was born on 23 June 1947 in Tours, France. She was educated at College Art and Design Talm in Tours and Beaux-Arts de Paris. She had her first solo exhibition at the Stevenson and Palluel Gallery in 1977. Her exhibitions took place in 1980 at the Biennale de Paris. In 1983, Champion Métadier received the 1st prize for painting at the 19th Salon d'art contemporain de Montrouge. In 1985, she exhibited at the Pasquale Trisorio gallery in Naples and participated in numerous exhibitions in various museums and institutions in Switzerland, Germany, Sweden, Austria, and South America.

In 2020, the Musée des Arts et Métiers (Paris) gave her carte blanche and exhibited the Toxictoys in its permanent collection until June 2021.

== Exhibitions (selected) ==
- 2020: Champion Métadier TOXICTOYS, Musée des Arts et Métiers, Paris
- 2019: Michael Steinberg Fine Art, New York
- 2018: Arts Protect 2018, Yvon Lambert Gallery, Paris, Fr
- 2017: Galerie Suzanne Tarasieve, Paris
- 2015: Champion Métadier, Drawing and Original Prints Museum, Gravelines, Fr
- 2014: Le rouge est mis, Musée d'art moderne et d'art contemporain, Nice, Fr
- 2013: Dock Art Fair 4th International Contemporary Art Fair, Galerie Louis Gendre, Lyon, Fr
