= Sylvie Selig =

French artist and sculptor (born 1941)

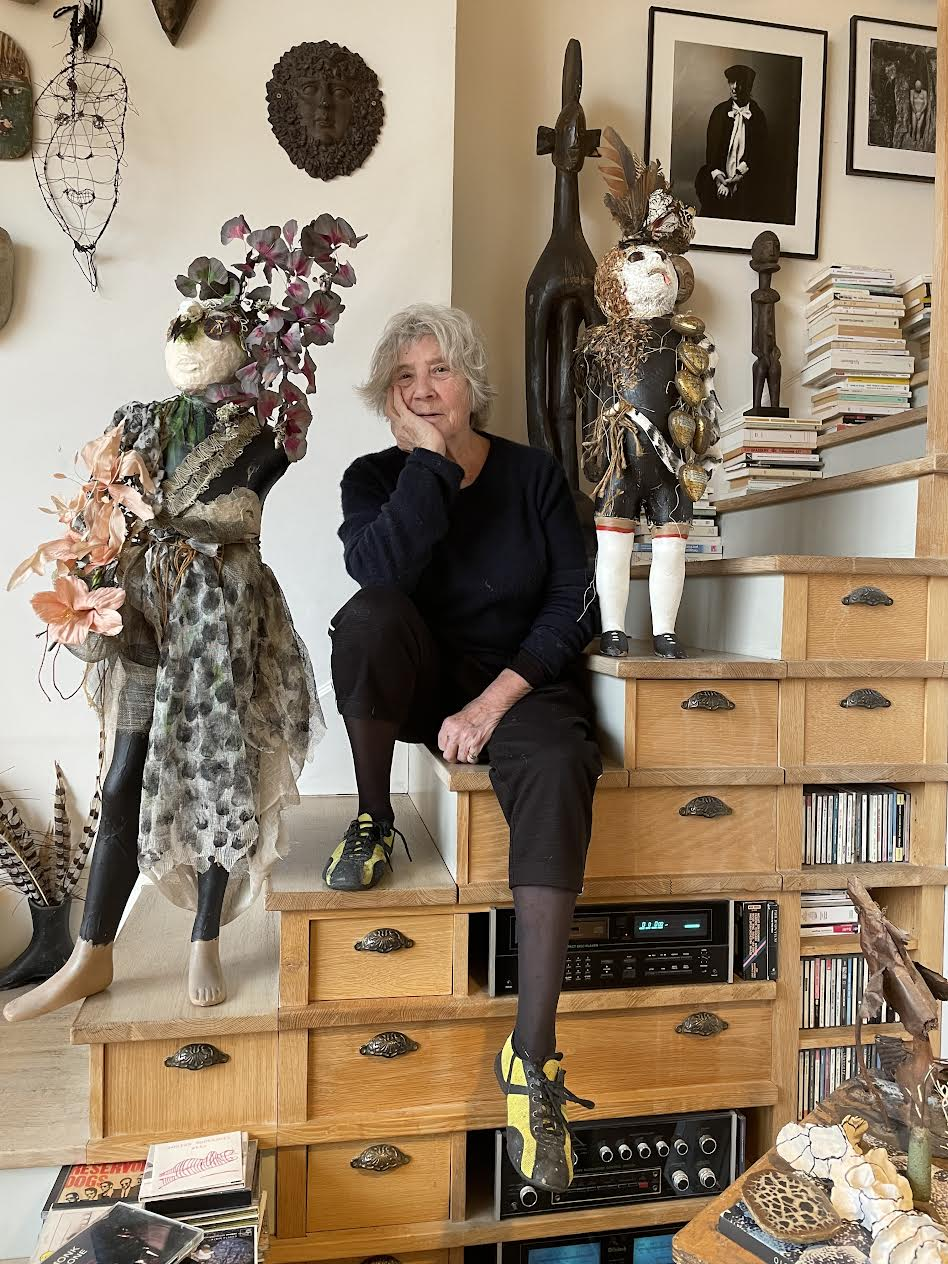
- Born: 23 January 1941 (age 84); Nice, Alpes-Maritimes, France
- Occupations: Painter and sculptor

Sylvie Selig (born 1941) is a French visual artist, painter, and sculptor.

== Artistic Journey ==
Sylvie Selig was born on 23 January 1941 in Nice, Alpes-Maritimes. From childhood, she was awarded prizes as a student at the École municipale d'Arts plastiques de Nice.

At the age of 13, she moved with her mother to Australia where she practiced painting. Competing with adults, she won the prize of the Victorian Artists Society and first prize at the Sun Youth Art Show both when she was 15 years old. Although enrolled at the National Gallery of Victoria Art School, she did not attend it much, preferring to explore on her own. She worked various small jobs to make a living and became an assistant to photographer Helmut Newton. In 1958, she designed theater sets for a play by Barry Humphries. At 17, she held her first solo exhibition at the Australian Galleries in Melbourne.

In the early 1960s, she returned to France. At that time, art was male-dominated and focused on abstraction, so she did not find a response to her painting and turned to illustration. She began publishing a weekly comic strip in the magazine Elle titled "Ça n'arrive qu'à Juliette". From 1966, she also illustrated children's books, such as Le Petit Arbre, published in 1967, written by Thelma Volckman Delabesse, which won the best book prize at the Bologna Children's Book Fair the same year.

Her career as an illustrator continued in New York where she gave birth to a son in 1966. Introduced by Tomi Ungerer, she worked for publications of the Condé Nast group, for magazines like Esquire and New York, as well as for children's book publishers. She illustrated The Happy Valley written by Eric Berne for Grove Press. This book later inspired writer Jonathan Lethem, who mentioned it in More Alive and Less Lonely.

In 1970, Sylvie Selig returned to Paris where she illustrated children's books. However, she grew tired of the publishing world which did not allow her to produce personal and daring work. In the 1980s, she decided to devote herself to her first passion, painting. She exhibited at the Jean-Marie Cupillard gallery in Grenoble and Saint-Tropez. Initially small, her paintings grew larger. Notably, her series of 15 paintings (240 cm (94 in) x 200 cm (79 in)) depicting the universe of 15 filmmakers who influenced her. This work was exhibited at the Espace Commines in 2009.

From 2009 to 2012, she painted a 30-meter-long and 1.7-meter-high oil on canvas titled Route 66. The large format was liberating for her, allowing her art to unfold in both time and space to tell a story. River of no return (painted from 2012 to 2015) is another oversized canvas: originally 30 meters long and 2.2 meters high, the project expanded to 140 meters in length. Instead of adding music and voice, as she had considered for Route 66, she wrote the story directly on the canvas, making the text a graphic element.

In a 2020 interview by Yoyo Maeght dedicated to Sylvie Selig, the work "River of No Return" is discussed (at 2'39")

From 2015 to 2018, she painted Stateless (50m x 2.2m), an oil on canvas exploring the notion of identity and its relationship to a state or nation, through the story of a hare helping a young refugee whom law enforcement tries to send back to her country

Her work then broke free from the limitations encountered early in her career: lack of editorial audacity and the constrained space of books. The length of these canvases is more akin to the unfolding of a film reel. At this time, she also began working with embroidery and terracotta. After also doing photography.

Starting in 2015, Sylvie Selig created her Weird Family: 28 monsters, as she calls them, made from mannequins dressed in recycled objects and fabrics. In 2016, she was persuaded to publish on social media. One of her followers, Michel Scognamillo, owner of the Métamorphoses bookstore, noticed her and offered her a first exhibition in his space on in Paris in 2021. Titled Inside Out Fairy Tales, this exhibition finally allowed Sylvie to showcase the more personal side of her work. On this occasion, a catalog prefaced by and a limited edition artist book, A Midsummer Night's Dream 5, a reinterpretation of Shakespeare's play, were published; 130 numbered copies were printed.

Another exhibition at the Métamorphoses bookstore followed in March 2023.

Rue Jacob Sylvie Aubenas

Exhibition curators Sam Bardaouil and Till Fellrath also noticed her on Instagram. For the 16th 2022–2023, where they were independent curators, they offered her a large space in the former Fagor factories where her oversized canvas/story Stateless, painted on 50 m (160 ft), could finally be displayed. Along with her embroidered drawings and her Weird Family. Biennale d'art contemporain de Lyon From 8 March to 7 July 2024, the Musée d'art contemporain de Lyon organized her first museum exhibition, centered around the monumental canvas River of No Return.

On 12 March 2024, Arte dedicated a report to her work "River of No Return" and its creator.

In its issue dated 9 April 2024, the newspaper Le Monde published an article about the artist and her work "River of No Return" which "meanders through the space" and "tells the walk of a young woman and two young men through a landscape that would seem bucolic if it were not invaded by very recognizable works of art."

On 1 November 2025, Sylvie Selig will participate to the 14th Tapeï Biennial "Whispers on the horizon" commissioned by the curators Sam Bardaoui and Till Felrath.

== Bibliography ==
- Thelma Volckman Delabesse, Le petit arbre, Paris, Tisné, 1967, 38 p.
- (en) Eric Berne, The Happy Valley, Grove Press, 1968 ISBN 978-0394475622
- Jonathan Lethem, More alive and less lonely: on books and writers, Melville House, 2017 ISBN 978-1-61219-603-9
- Inside Out Fairy Tales. Les fables cruelles de Sylvie Selig. With texts by Michel Scognamillo and Sylvie Aubenas, Librairie Métamorphoses, Paris, 2021.
- SELIG, Sylvie, A Midsummer Night's Dream, reinterpreted by Sylvie Selig, Paris, Métamorphoses, 2021.
