= Jean-François Batellier =

French cartoonist

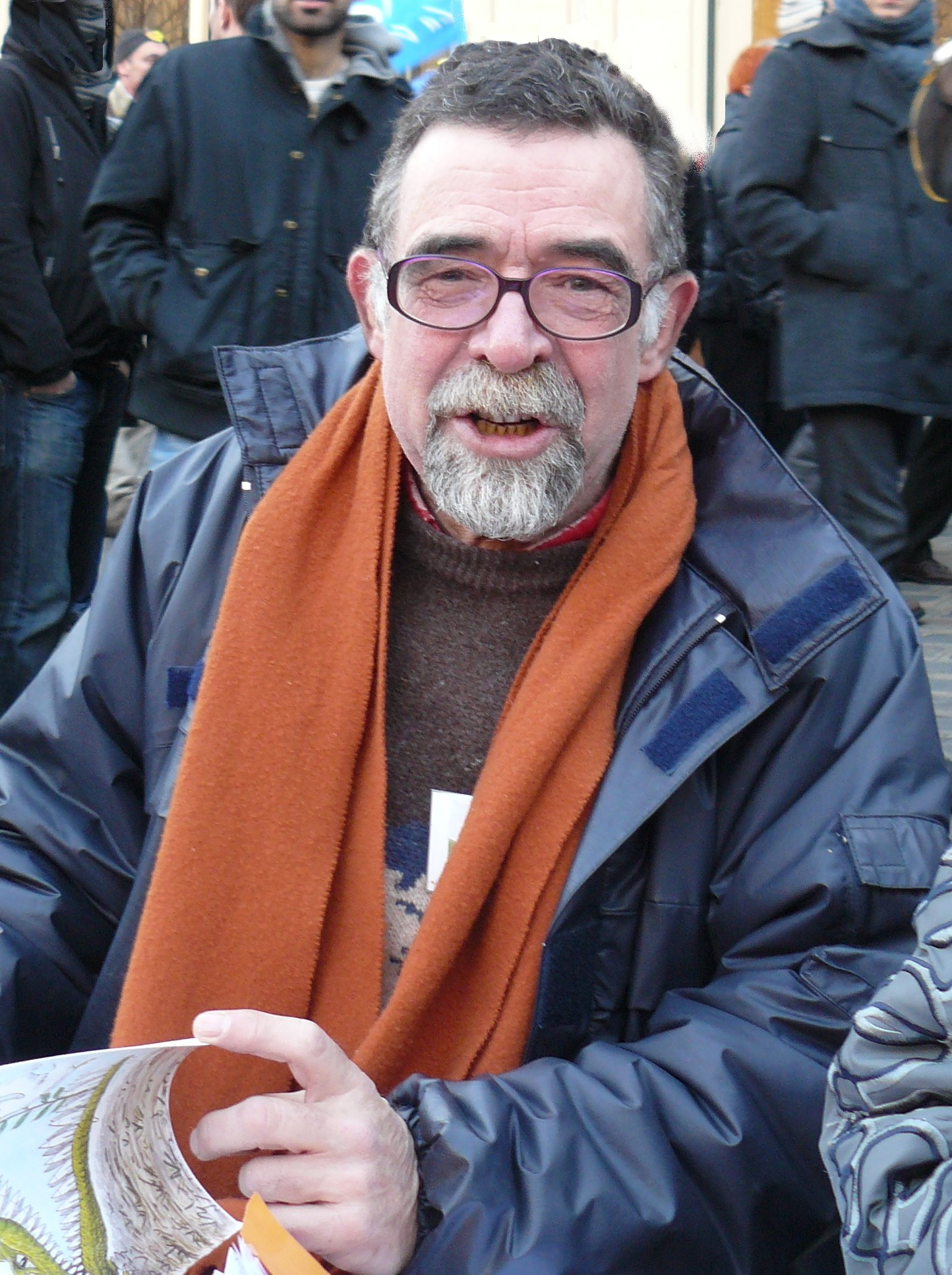
Jean-François Batellier, 2009

Jean-François Batellier (born 1947 in Paris) is an independent "political" (in the broadest sense) cartoonist. He works in the dazibao style, frequently exhibiting his drawings on the streets. He has had many court cases concerned with the legality of so exhibiting his work. Several volumes of drawings have been published. His themes are existential questions, repression, consumption, alienation, loneliness, and high-tech living, to mention but a few.

He has also published drawings in some daily newspapers like Les Échos and Le Canard enchaîné.

== Bibliography ==
- 1978: Sans Retour Ni Consigne (No Deposit No Return) (the caption appears on a planet Earth)
- 1980: N'En Jetez Plus (That's Enough)
- 1983: Y'A Quelqu'un? (Is Anybody Out There?)
- 1984: Aux Larmes Crocodiles (Crocodile Tears)
