= Gérard Locardi =

French painter (1915–1998)

Gérard Locardi (15 April 1915 in Paris – 12 April 1998 in Marseille) was a French painter.

In the Académie de la Grande Chaumière in Paris, he has been student of Othon Friesz and Édouard Georges Mac-Avoy for the painting and Despiau for sculpture.

He has been mainly a painter who found his inspiration in antique themes, two of his paintings are exhibited in the Chapelle de la Charité in Carpentras, Provence.
