= Thérèse Lemoine-Lagron =

French painter

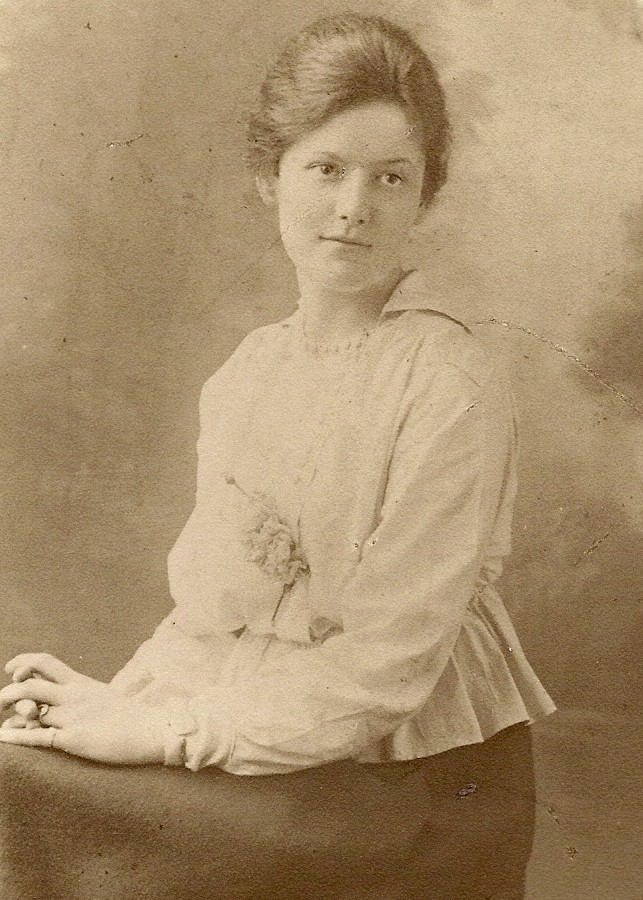
- Lemoine-Lagron in 1912
- Born: Thérèse Lemoine; 23 August 1891; Gournay-sur-Marne
- Died: 30 March 1949 (aged 57); Neuilly-sur-Seine
- Known for: flower painting

Thérèse Lemoine-Lagron (23 August 1891 – 30 March 1949) was a French watercolour painter known for her still lifes of flowers. She also painted war damaged churches in the 1940s.

== Life ==
Lemoine-Lagron was born in the Paris suburb of Gournay-sur-Marne in 1891. Her father Jules Lemoine was a physicist and assistant professor who would be awarded the title of Officer of the Legion of Honor. She was trained from 1909 to 1911 at the National School of Decorative Arts. Afterwards she married a jewellery designer named Lagron when she was 22 and her professional name became "Thérèse Lemoine-Lagron".

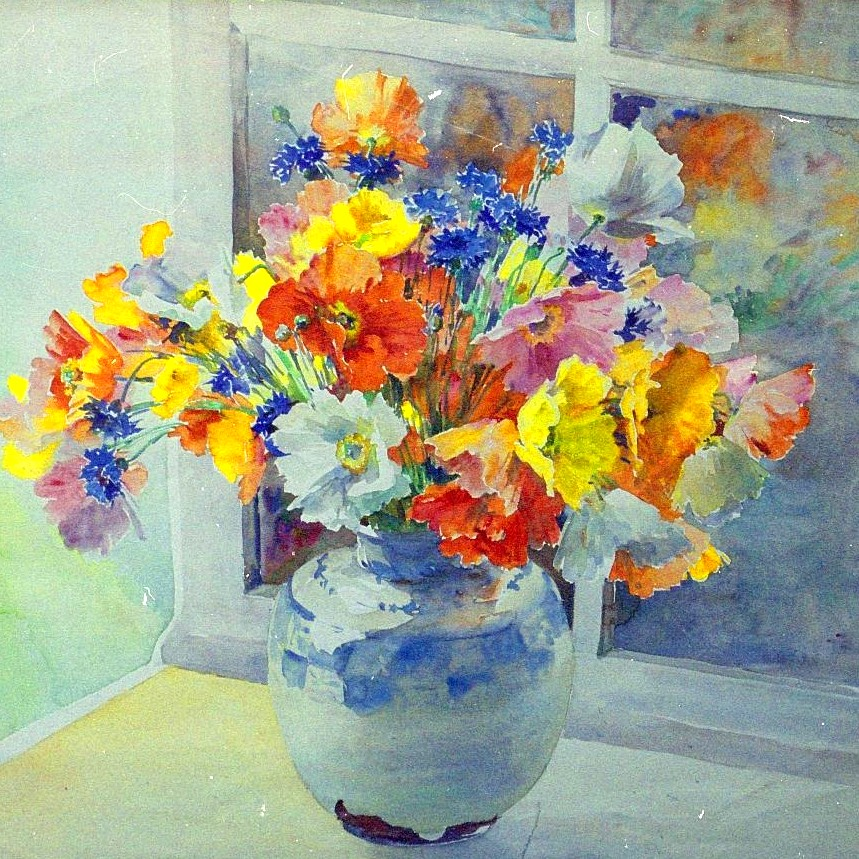
"Bouquet vase blanc-bleu" from the 1940s

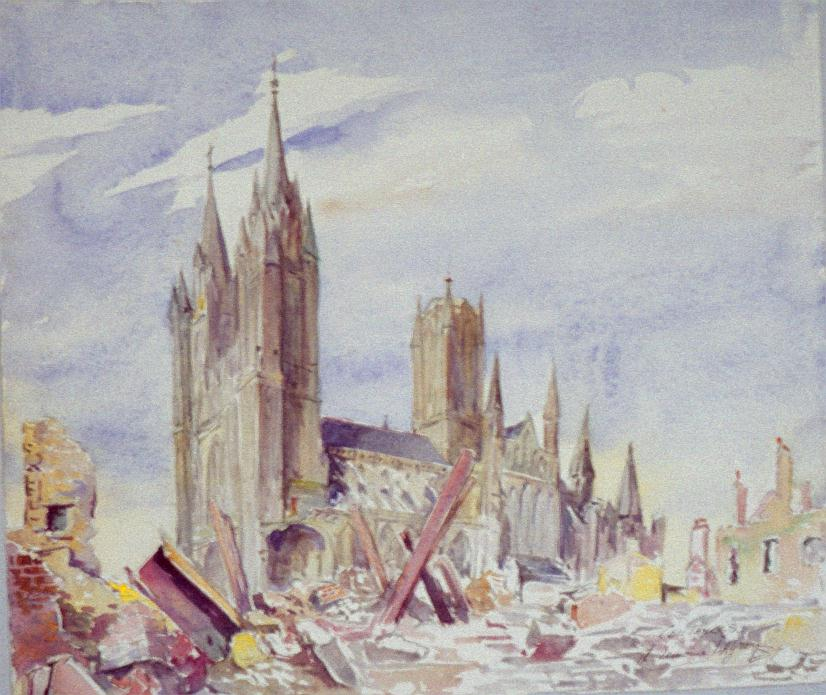
Cathedrale de Coutances in 1944

She began to exhibit her paintings in 1921. Her paintings were of flowers and she was a pupil of Eugénie Faux-Froidure who was older than her. Eugénie was a water colour painter of flowers. Lemoine-Lagron would buy vases from antique dealers and then arrange flowers from local florists as the subject of her paintings.

In time she took her own students which included the painter Christiane Francoise Groc.

Lemoine-Lagron died in 1949 in Neuilly-sur-Seine at her home 63 rue Boursault, Paris.
