= Jisbar =

French artist

- Born: Jean-Baptiste Launay; 7 June 1989 (age 36); Val-d'Isère
- Movement: Pop art, Street art
- Website: www.jisbar-art.com

Jean-Baptiste Launay (born 7 June 1989 in Val-d'Isère), better known by his artistic name Jisbar, is a French contemporary artist and painter. He lives and works in Lisbon.

== Notable collaborations ==
In 2017, Jisbar collaborated with the French shoe company J. M. Weston, to design customized models. In 2018, he collaborated with Armani Exchange, to create a capsule collection for the brand's #st_ART collection. In 2019, during his Bangkok exhibition, he worked with BMW and customized three bicycles from their range, the BMW M Cruise Bike. In 2021, as a collaboration with LG, Jisbar created three pieces specifically for the LG OLED Gallery, each one boasting a different theme: Sport, Game, Design.

In 2022, Jisbar customized an F1 car for Ayrton Senna, presented at the Monte Carlo Grand Prix.

== Exhibitions ==
2016

- Addenda, Cité nationale de l'histoire de l'immigration, Paris, Fr

2018

- 1st US Solo Exhibition, Gallery 444, San Francisco, CA

2019

- The French Connection, 19 Karen Contemporary Artspace, Melbourne, Australia
- Jisbar's Playground, Bangkok, Thailand

2020

- Pop ou pas Pop, Le Carton Voyageur, Baud, Fr
- First Painting in Space, Galerie Montmartre, Paris, Fr

2021

- LA COLOMBA, Venice, It
- Jisbar On Stage, Galerie Montmartre, Paris, Fr

2022

- Art Solo by Jisbar, Taipei, Taiwan
- Good Vibration, Abidjan, Ivory Coast
- Evolution, Paris, Fr
- Thing Thing Art Space, GQ Taïwan Festival, Taipei, Taiwan
- Unwrap, Sist'Art Gallery, Venice, Italy

2026

- Art of the Game, Gallery 444, San Francisco, CA
