= Henri Sert =

French painter (1938–1964)

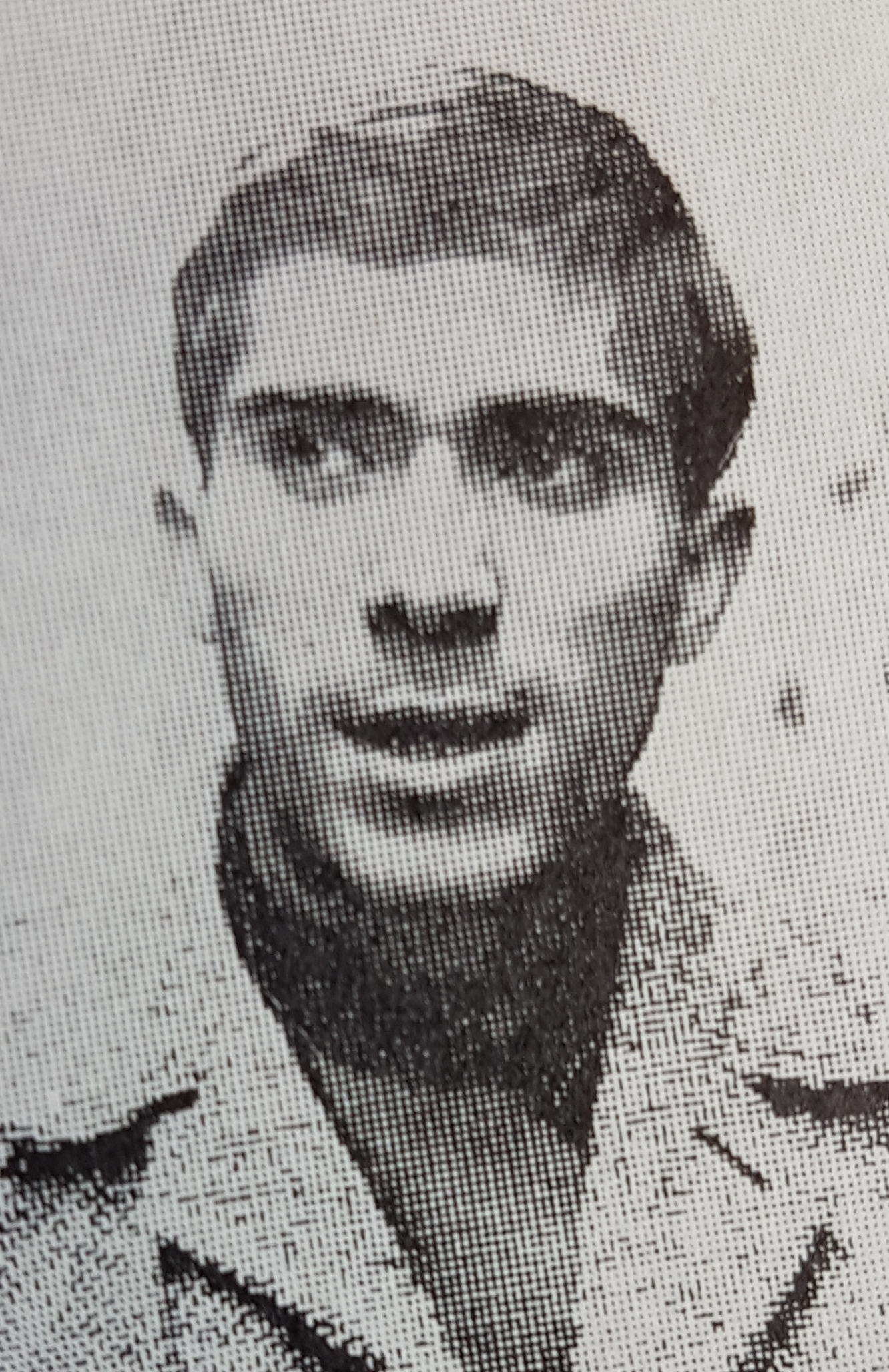
- Born: 27 July 1938; La Réunion, France
- Died: 22 March 1964 (aged 25); Stockholm, Sweden
- Occupation: Painter
- Works: The Rich and the Poor (1958); Baroque (1959); Meeting (1960); Woman lying (1964)

Henri Paul Sert (27 July 1938 – 22 March 1964) was a French and Swedish artist.

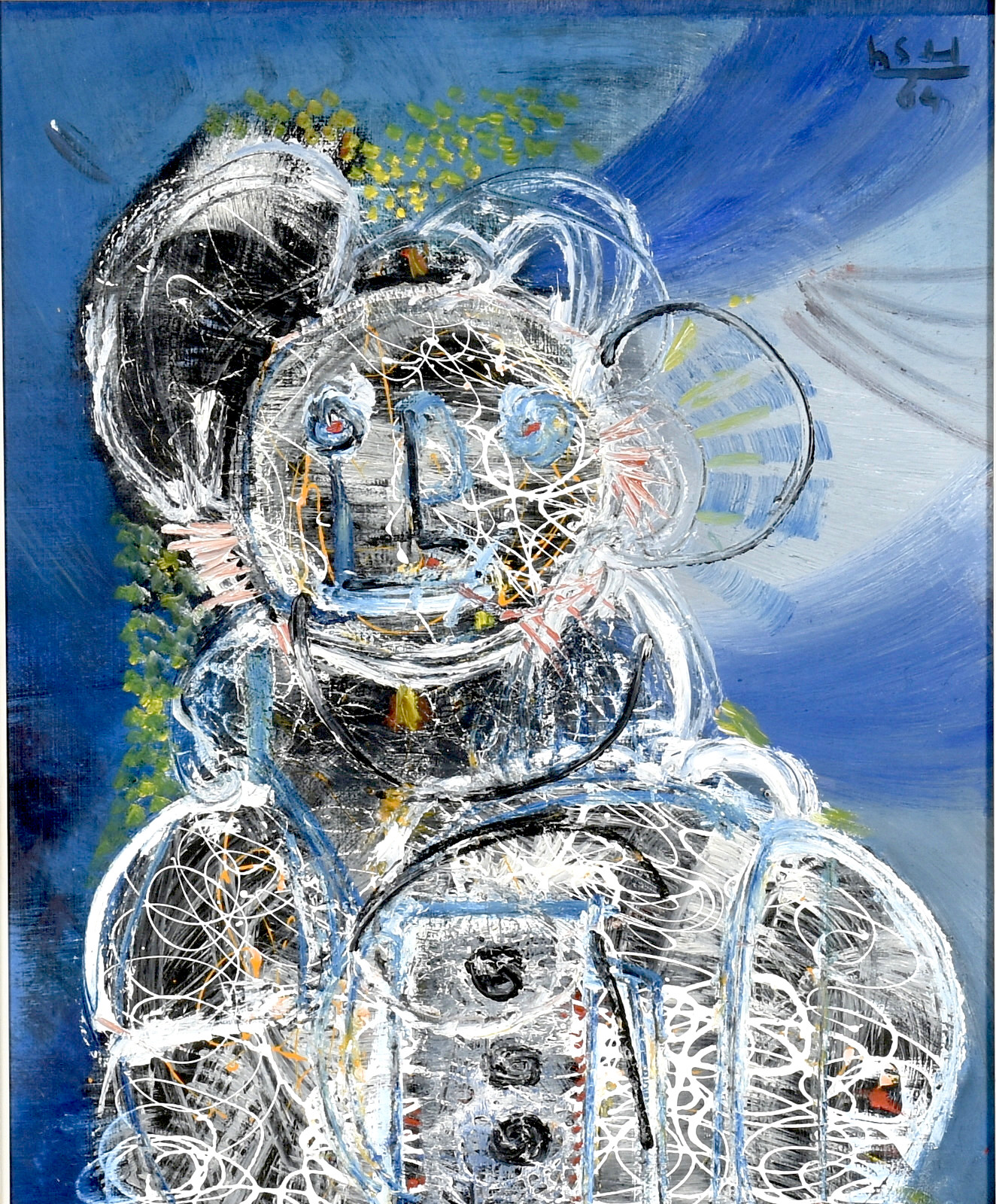
Vivante, 1964

The Rich and the Poor

He was born in La Réunion, Madagascar. When he was 10 years old, Sert's mother brought him to Paris, where he had received his education at a Jesuit monastery. After being left at the monastery, he would never again see any family member. Sert left the monastery, he then became an apprentice to a French painter called René. As soon as he thought he was competent, Sert parted with his master and tried to earn a living as a professional artist on his own. He was soon seen as a prodigy in the neighborhoods around Montparnasse.

Though known in France, "It was Expressen employee Svante Löfgren who discovered (for Sweden) the then 20-year-old painter in Paris, a young genius, a self-immolating young man who lived to paint." Löfgren had been initially introduced to Sert by the actor Lars Burman. Löfgren, writing for the Expressen in Paris, stated in his 1958 article on Sert, "He can become one of the greats of his generation. If he does not starve to death." In fact, Sert had become "close to starvation. He had written and asked for money, collapsed and was rescued in hospital." Löfgren's report on these events motivated some Swedes to write to Sert in Paris, "promis[ing] him his own studio and cash in exchange for him working together on an exhibition."

Sert got help to get to Sweden, and the idea was that he would do a big show. He traveled to Sweden where he had the chance to show his art at different exhibitions in Copenhagen and Oslo. Notable exhibitions included Galleri Danielsson in Borgholm, Galerie Marya in Copenhagen, the Art Association in Oslo and Gallery Danielsson in Borgholm.

He first set up in Ven, "where he borrowed a studio in Emil Johansson-Thor's old farm." However, before his exhibition shows could be arranged and presented problems developed. Sert having little money had begun to exchange his paintings for necessities. "...He did not have enough paintings (for his exhibition), he had exchanged them for clothes, food and new colors (paints)." Still, the reviews were positive, "His oils shimmer like mother-of-pearl with myriads of splashes of paint and glazed brushstrokes, sometimes fine-tuned to the smallest detail with plump dot patterns", wrote Alvar Jonsson. "French sensation in the Art Association" wrote a Danish newspaper after the exhibition 1959 Copenhagen. Still, Sert was beginning to develop a problematic reputation. He was "described by contemporaries as a genius, problem child and as unreliable as the wind.". Throughout the difficulties his dedication to his art remained constant. He did all of his painting at night. He painted intensively and could sit squatting for long periods of time. The canvas lay on the floor; Sert did not use an easel. "The painting just flowed out of him. It was a constant flow – but still creative. He was not a pondering artist; he was a gift of nature with a creative power." Directly stated, the author Ivar Ahlstedt wrote that to Sert "painting was necessary, living was not very necessary".

"During the early 1960s, Lena Eile and Henri Sert met in the confusion during the student carnival in Lund. “Henri Sert was a bit of a strange bird,” admits Lena Eile: “a short and well-dressed artist's soul, newly arrived from France.” Eile and Sert would become betrothed. The couple lived together for a time in Lund and continued their relationship when Sert moved to Stockholm. Eventually, personal problems would begin to harm the relationship. As Eile recalled, "I went along with things until then, but when I noticed all the stuff with drugs and everything else, then I gave up. There were constant disappointments; promises that were not kept; periods that weren’t tolerable. Living like that means a home life is difficult."

Sert's personal issues began to also have an effect on his patrons and gallery owners. According to author Lars Widding, the patrons got tired of the young painter who had such a hard time adapting. In recent years he has painted and starved. Others felt it was not Sert who caused the problems with his patrons but rather the "patrons, who were to represent his art, exploited and swindled the artist instead."

On 22 March 1964, Sert was found dead, probably due to an overdose of sleeping pills. "Lena Eile was not in Sweden when Henri Sert died, but she participated in the memorial exhibition organized at Gummeson's Gallery that year." "It was great, but I felt it was hard with these guys there, who pretended to be his patrons, but who took advantage of him." Author Lars Widding wrote, "Young artist genius died in Stockholm. Why could we not afford to let him live? "

Two memorial exhibitions were held in Stockholm in 1964 and in Copenhagen in 1965. In March 2015, an exhibition of Sert's work was held by Åmells in Stockholm.
