= Jean Maurice Rothschild =

- Born: 1902
- Died: 1998 (aged 95–96)
- Occupation: French furniture designer

Jean-Maurice Rothschild (1902–1998) was an interior designer and furniture artist, whose most famous works were for the cruise liner Normandie, and the restaurant of the Eiffel Tower.
