= List of French women photographers =

This is a list of women photographers who were born in France or whose works are closely associated with that country.

== A ==
- Leila Alaoui (1982–2016), French-Moroccan commercial photographer and video artist

== B ==
- Martine Barrat (date of birth unknown), based in New York, has photographed the black inhabitants of Harlem since the early 1980s
- Claude Batho (1935–1981), remembered for the detailed images of her home and for her series on Claude Monet's garden at Giverny
- Valérie Belin (born 1964), whose photographs have played with the distinction between illusion and reality
- Denise Bellon (1902–1999), associated with the Surrealist movement
- Marie-Lydie Cabanis Bonfils (1837–1918), photographer active in the Middle East and co-founder of Maison Bonfils photography studio in Beirut
- Marguerite Bornhauser (born 1989), visual artist and photographer
- Alexandra Boulat (1962–2007), photojournalist and co-founder of the VII Photo Agency
- Adeline Boutain (1862–1946), photographer, postcard publisher

== C ==
- Claude Cahun (1894–1954), photographer and artist, remembered for her self-portraits (1927–1947)
- Sophie Calle (born 1953), writer, photographer and installation artist, also photography professor
- Georgette Chadourne (1899–1983), surrealist photographer
- Vivienne Chandler (1947–2013), actress and professional photographer
- Yvonne Chevalier (1899–1982), magazine photographer

== D ==
- Dominique Darbois (1925–2014), photojournalist who has concentrated on the victims of European colonialism
- Sophie Delaporte (born 1971), fashion photographer
- Françoise Demulder (1947–2008), war photographer
- Stéphanie Di Giusto (active since 2004), film director, photographer, art director
- Delphine Diallo (born 1977), French-Senegalese art photographer
- Geneviève Élisabeth Disdéri (c. 1817–1878), early photographer, wife of André-Adolphe-Eugène Disdéri
- Suzanne Doppelt (born 1956), writer, photographer and educator
- Claudine Doury (born 1959), photojournalist

== F ==
- Flore (born 1963), French-Spanish artistic photographer
- Gisèle Freund (1908–2000), German-born, known for her documentary photography and portraits of writers and artists

== G ==
- Gaëlle Ghesquière (born 1972), photographer, writer, journalist, portraits of pop artists
- Laure Mathilde Gouin (1829-1916), painter and photographer, colourist for photographers Alexis Gouin and Bruno Braquehais, from 1874 worked independently under the name of Mme. M. Gouin.
- Laure Albin Guillot (1879–1962), portraits of Paris celebrities, wide variety of other genres, several high-ranking administrative positions

== H ==
- Genevieve Hafner (fl 2003), street photographer based in New York
- Florence Henri (1893–1982), surrealist
- Françoise Huguier (born 1942), travel photographer

== I ==
- Irina Ionesco (born 1930), erotic images of lavishly dressed women posing provocatively
- Dominique Issermann (born 1947), portrait and fashion photographer

== J ==
- Valérie Jouve (born 1964), photographer, filmmaker

== K ==
- Germaine Krull (1897–1985), photographically-illustrated books, photojournalism
- Bénédicte Kurzen (born 1980), photographer and photojournalist based in Nigeria
- Anouk Masson Krantz, photographer, living in the United States

== L ==
- Brigitte Lacombe (born 1950), photographer of film sets
- Louise Laffon (1828–1885), early photographer with a studio in Paris from 1859
- Suzanne Lafont (born 1949), art photographer
- Céline Laguarde (1873-1961) Pictorialist photographer
- Camille Lepage (1988–2014), photojournalist
- Catherine Leroy (1945–2006), photojournalist, particularly known for her photography of the Vietnam war
- Natacha Lesueur (born 1971), photographer and plasticist
- Ariane Lopez-Huici (born 1945), art photographer

== M ==
- Benedicte Van der Maar (born 1968), art photography, human photography
- Dora Maar (1907–1997), both a commercial and a street photographer in the 1920s and 30s
- Mayotte Magnus (born 1934), French-born photographer based in England
- Dolorès Marat (born 1944), art photography
- Alix Marie (born 1989), artist working with photography and sculpture
- Isabelle Massieu (1844–1932), travel writer and photographer
- Sarah Moon (born 1941), fashion photographer, now concentrating on gallery work

== N ==
- Anaïs Napoleón (1827–1912), pioneering French-Spanish photographer
- Janine Niépce (1921–2007), prolific photojournalist
- Françoise Nuñez (1957–2021), travel photographer

== P ==
- Sabine Pigalle (born 1963), travel photographer
- Kate Polin (born 1967), art photographer

== R ==
- Ann Ray (born 1969), artist and photographer
- Bettina Rheims (born 1952), strip-tease artists and acrobats, stuffed animals
- Sophie Ristelhueber (born 1949), who has photographed the effects of war on landscape
- Emmanuelle Riva (1927–2017), primarily an actor but also a noted and published photographer

== S ==
- Lise Sarfati (born 1958), images of listless young people in Russia and the United States
- Christine Spengler (born 1945), photojournalist who has concentrated on the victims of war

== T ==
- Yvette Troispoux (1914–2007), remembered for photographing people at social events

== V ==
- Agnès Varda (1928–2019), film director and photographer, documentary realism, feminist issues
- Jenny de Vasson (1872–1920), highly productive early female photographer
- Madame Vaudé-Green (1822-1902), nineteenth century French photographer of religious art
- Véronique de Viguerie (born 1978), photojournalist, particularly known for her photography of the most recent Afghan war

== See also ==
- List of women photographers
- List of French photographers
