= Escaladieu Abbey =

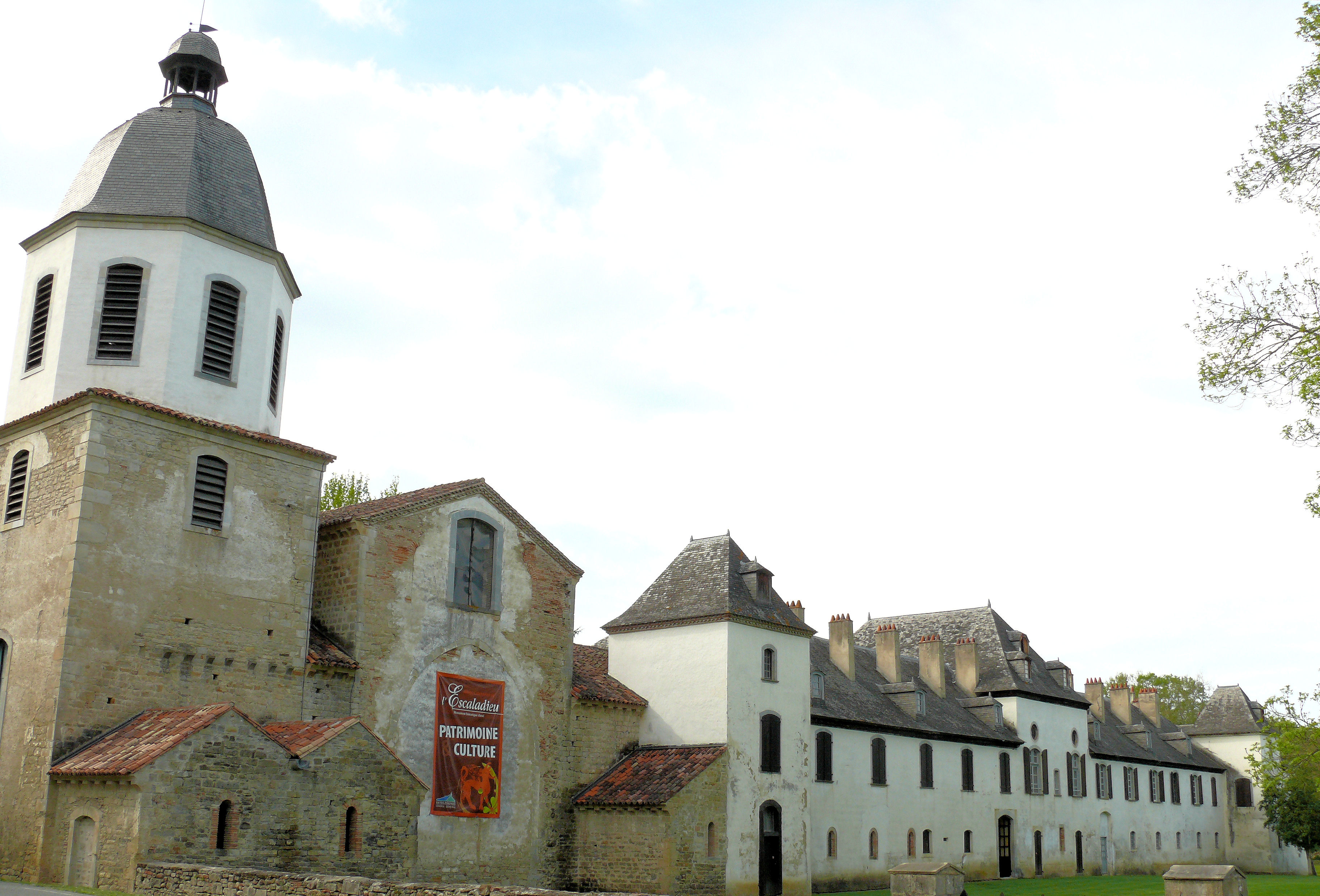
- Abbaye de l'Escaladieu
- Escaladieu Abbey
- 43°06′36″N 0°15′25″E
- Location: Bonnemazon
- Country: France
- Denomination: Roman Catholic

History
- Status: Museum

Architecture
- Functional status: Active
- Architectural type: Chapel (first building) / Abbey
- Years built: C12th

Escaladieu Abbey (French: l'Abbaye de l'Escaladieu) was a Cistercian abbey located in the French commune of Bonnemazon in the Hautes-Pyrénées. Its name derives from the Latin Scala Dei ("ladder of God"). The abbey was founded in 1142 and became an important pilgrimage stop on the Way of St. James en route to the Cathedral of Santiago de Compostela. The abbey is situated at the confluence of the Luz and the Arros rivers near the Château de Mauvezin.

In the middle of the 12th century, a group of monks under the protection of the count of Bigorre who lived at Cabadur in the Gripp valley in the modern-day commune of Campan, near Bagnères-de-Bigorre, wanted to move to a more hospitable location and therefore establish the abbey at Bonnemazon. The abbey became the center of the expansion of southern French Cistercian expansion and founded eight abbeys in Spain (including ones in Fitero, Sacraménia, and Véruéla) and two in Gascony (Flaran Abbey and Bouillas Abbey).

The abbey was continuously inhabited by Cistercian monks until 1830 when it sold to an unknown local family. In 1986, the abbey was purchased by the Conseil Général des Hautes-Pyrénées which undertook its restoration.

The abbey was passed by, and therefore featured in the television coverage of, the 19th stage of the Tour de France 2018.
