= Pigalle =

Pigalle may refer to:

== Places ==
Paris, France

- Quartier Pigalle, an area in Paris around the Place Pigalle, on the border between the 9th and the 18th arrondissements
- Place Pigalle, public square in the Quartier Pigalle at the foot of the Montmartre hill
- Pigalle station, a station on lines 2 and 12 of the Paris Metro
- Théâtre Pigalle, was a theatre in Paris, located in the rue Pigalle in the ninth arrondissement

Elsewhere

- Pigalle Club, a supper club and live music venue in Piccadilly, London

== Arts ==
- Pigalle (band), French rock band formed in 1982
- Pigalle (documentary), a 2006 documentary by Asa Mader
- Pigalle (film), a 1994 film by Karim Dridi

== Persons ==
- Anne Pigalle, French chanteuse (singer) and multimedia artist
- Jean-Baptiste Pigalle (1714–1785), French sculptor
- Sabine Pigalle (born 1963), French photographer
