= Necrocapitalism =

Socioeconomical concept

Necrocapitalism is a socioeconomical concept introduced in the mid-2000s and formalized by Subhabrata Bobby Banerjee from City, University of London, in a 2008 publication of the same name. It is defined as a contemporary form of organizational accumulation that involves dispossession and the subjugation of life to the power of death.

== Definition ==
A form of capitalism where a country’s trade and industry are founded on, linked to and dependent directly or indirectly on death and the profits accruing from it.

In her article Unveiling the Necrocapitalist Dimensions of the Shadow Carceral State: On Pay-to-Stay to Recoup the Cost of Incarceration, Brittany Friedman, demonstrates how necrocapitalism is an increasing vector of civil and administrative pipelines to incarceration, civil financial alternatives to criminal sanctions, and innovations to generate criminal justice revenue.

In his review about Monsanto: a photographic investigation by photographer by Mathieu Asselin, Dr. Thom Davies describes Monsanto's behavior, that caused ecological, social, and health problems for countless people across the world, as necrocapitalism

== Academic Case Study ==
- Orr, W., Henne, K., Lee, A., Harb, J.I. and Alphonso, F.C. (2023), Necrocapitalism in the Gig Economy: The Case of Platform Food Couriers in Australia. Antipode, 55: 200-221.

== See also ==
- Necropolitics
- Accumulation by dispossession
- Imperialism
- Colonialism
- Biopolitics
- ToxicDocs
