= Sicard de Lordat =

French architect

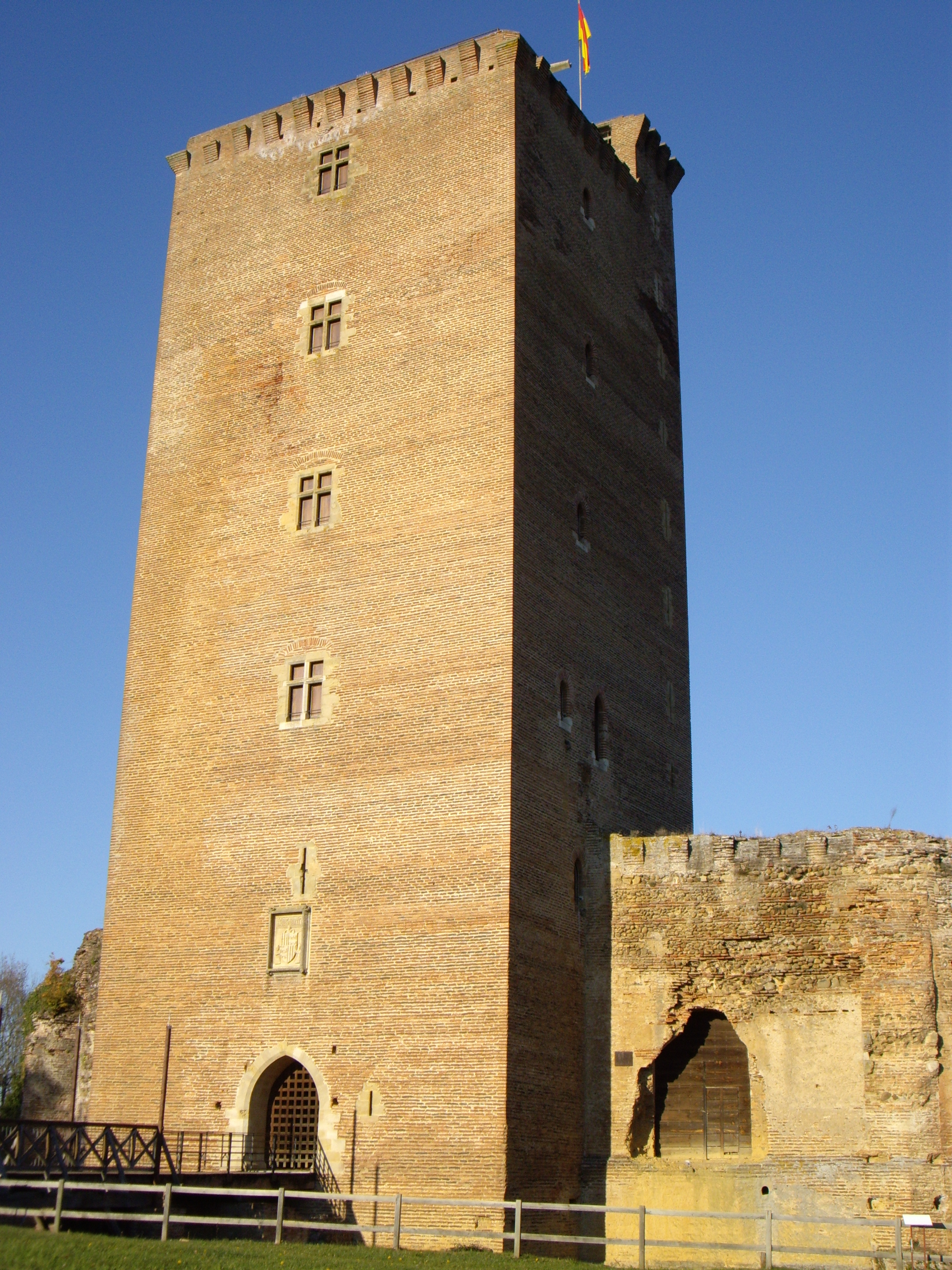
Château de Montaner

Sicard de Lordat was a 14th-century architect from the County of Foix, now in modern-day France, who worked for Gaston Fébus (Gaston III of Foix-Béarn). He is noted particularly for working with brick, a material that was cheap and allowed speedier construction.

== Works ==
- Château de Mauvezin
- Château de Montaner
- Château de Morlanne
- Keep of the Château de Pau
