= Françoise Nuñez =

French photographer (1957–2021)

- Born: 17 March 1957; Toulouse, France
- Died: 23 December 2021 (aged 64); Marseille, France
- Occupation: Photographer

Françoise Nuñez (1957 – 23 December 2021) was a French photographer.

== Biography ==
Born in Toulouse in 1957, Nuñez came from a Spanish family, Núñez. She began her career as a photographer in 1975 after learning black-and-white printing in the studio of Jean Dieuzaide. Dieuzaide introduced her to Bernard Plossu, whom she married in 1986 and had two children with, Joaquim and Manuela. For her work, she regularly traveled to India, Ethiopia, South America, and Japan. She utilized the Galerie Camera Obscura in Paris.

Nuñez died in Marseille on 23 December 2021, at the age of 64.

== Publications ==
- Ports (1994)
- L’Inde jour et nuit (2004)
- Mu-jô, Une invitation à Nara (2010)
- Nous avons fait un très beau voyage (2010)
- Ensemble (2010)
- À Valaparaiso (2012)
- Kalari (2015)
- De Djibouti à Addis, 1980 (2018)

== Exhibitions ==
- "Flamenco" at the Galerie Le Lac Gelé (Nîmes, 2013)
- "Caravanes" at Atelier du Midi (Arles, 2013)
- "Voyage(s)" at Le Château d'eau (Toulouse, 2015)
- "Juntos" at the Museo Nacional de Bellas Artes (Buenos Aires, 2015)
- "Étonnantes affinités" at the Couvent des Jacobins (Toulouse, 2015)
- "Voyages extraordinaires" at the Festival du Regard (Cergy, 2020)
- "Modus Vivendi" at the Librairie et galerie Ombres Blanches (Toulouse, 2021)
- "Éthiopie (1980-2012)" at Flaran Abbey (Valence-sur-Baïse, 2021)
- Valparaiso" at the Galerie Territoires Partagés (Marseille, 2021)
