= National Centre for Photography =

Photography organisation and gallery in Ballarat, Australia

Coordinates: 37.5624°S 143.8574°E

The National Centre for Photography, is an Australian organisation with headquarters, workshops and galleries in the regional city of Ballarat in Victoria, Australia. It exhibits, promotes, and provides education, in photography. It is associated with, and is an initiative of, the Ballarat International Foto Biennale.

== History ==
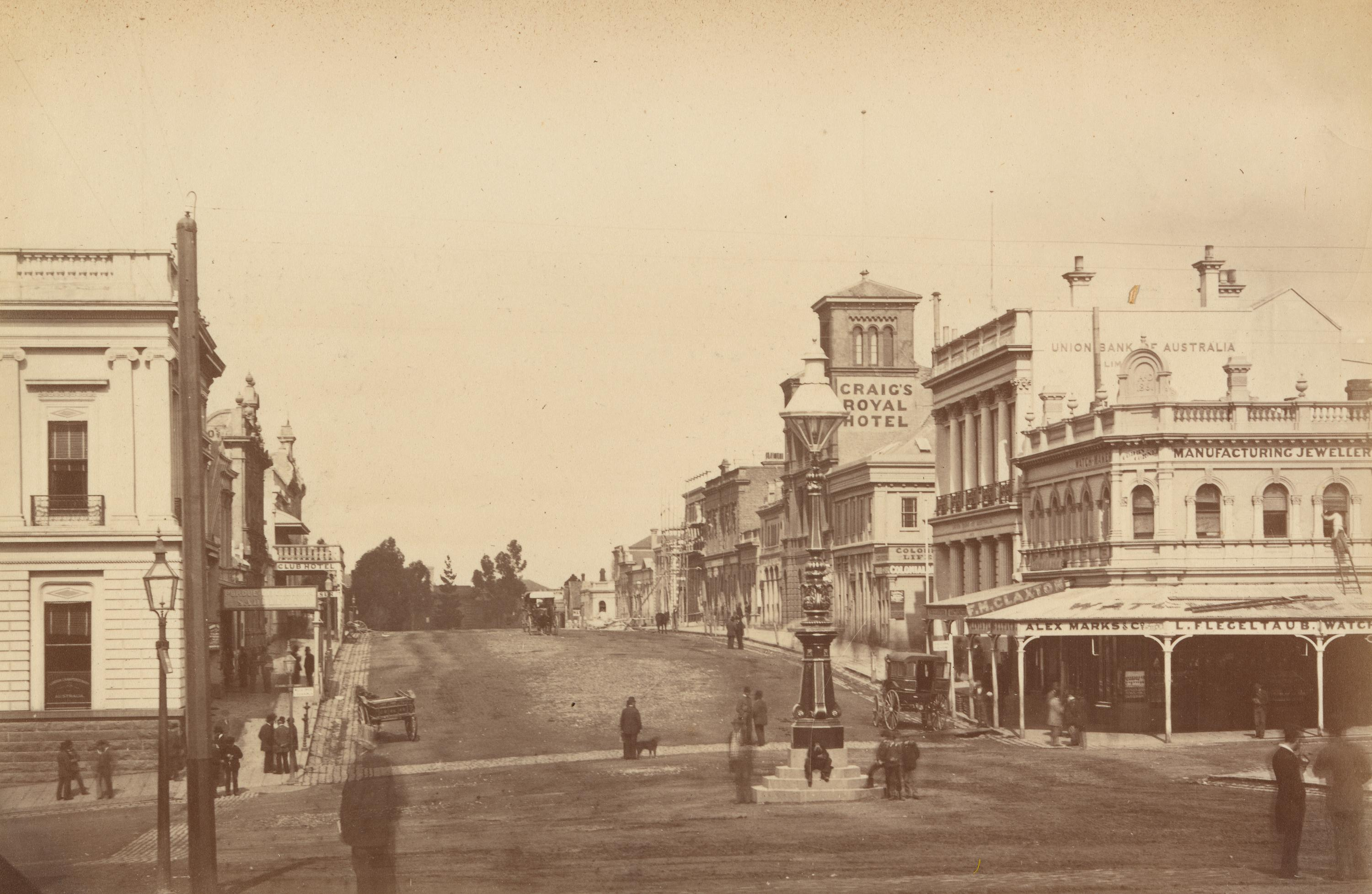
Fred Kruger, Lydiard Street with the Union Bank on right, looking south from Sturt Street, Ballarat, 1871, National Gallery of Victoria, Melbourne. Gift of Mrs Beryl M. Curl, 1979.

=== Foundation ===
The National Centre for Photography, was registered as a business with ASIC in March 2018 as an initiative of the Ballarat International Foto Biennale.

In April 2018, the former Union Bank building at 4 Lydiard Street South and 4 Bath Lane, Ballarat Central, was purchased for restoration and renovation as the home of the National Centre.

=== Government support ===
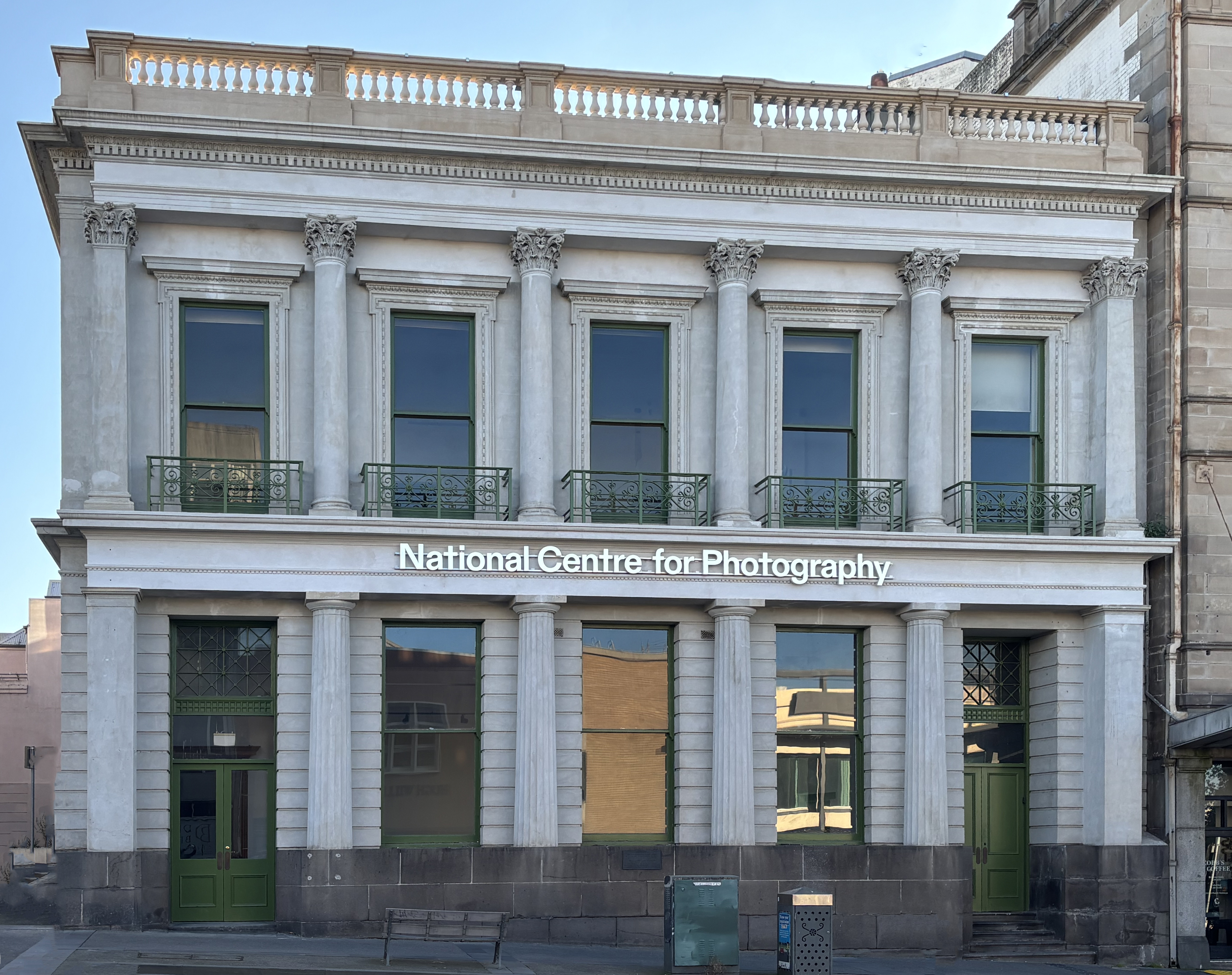
National Centre for Photography, Ballarat, in July 2026

In November 2020, the Andrews Labor Government announced the award of $6.7 million from the Victorian Government's Tourism Infrastructure Program for the development of the National Centre for Photography in Ballarat. This funding enabled the commencement of Stage One Development for the National Centre: it was estimated that on completion it would generate $75.7 million in economic benefit across the next 15 years from visitors and associated tourism.

Victorian Minister for Tourism, Sport and Major Events Martin Pakula confirmed the contribution of the Biennale to the feasibility of the Centre: “The Ballarat International Foto Biennale is one of Victoria’s iconic regional events and the National Centre for Photography will allow it to contribute to Ballarat’s economy and jobs strength year-round.” Then-Artistic Director of the Biennale, Fiona Sweet, stated that: “This money is a real investment in culture – it directly supports the arts in regional Victoria and will no doubt generate significant visitation to Ballarat.”

=== Stage One Development ===
In September 2021, the Conservation Management Plan for the National Centre site was completed; the Internal Heritage Permit for Level 1 was issued in February 2023, and the Archaeological Management Plan for the site was completed in May 2023. For the 2023 Ballarat International Foto Biennale (August-October 2023), Lisa Roet's Golden Monkey was installed on the exterior of the building.

In December 2023, planning permission was granted for the entire building, and the External Heritage Permit was issued in June 2024. Vanessa Gerrans, CEO & Artistic Director Ballarat International Foto Biennale, oversees the project. Construction firm Searle Bros were appointed in August 2024, and construction, demolition and excavation commenced on-site in November 2024. Kerstin Thompson Architects (KTA) have been appointed as architects and designers for the National Centre project; and the project team has included project management firm Ontoit, Slattery Australia as quantity surveyors, and Sampson Wong & Associates as building surveyors.

The Internal Heritage Permit for Levels 2 and 3 was issued in April 2025, and restoration of the heritage facade on Lydiard Street South began in June 2025. For the 2025 Ballarat International Foto Biennale (23 August - 19 October 2025), Dave Jones was commissioned with Dr Deanne Gilson to install the illuminated moth sculpture Mumu Mirri.

Following completion of Stage 1 construction, on 20 September 2026 the National Centre for Photography opened to the public for the first time. The occasion was marked by the inaugural Ballarat Youth Photography Prize, an exhibition, running 28 September–2 October, of 95 photographs by Ballarat photographers aged 12 to 25. The contest was devised by the Ballarat International Foto Biennale's youth council 'GroupFoto' and supported by the Victorian Government's Youth Fest initiative, the Department of Education's Strategic Partnerships Program, and UFS.

=== Stage 2 Development ===
This phase will complete the National Centre for Photography, including four galleries, for major temporary exhibitions by local, national and international artists; educational workshop spaces; an artist-in-residence program and opportunities for community artists to exhibit; and a stockroom housing the Ballarat International Foto Biennale’s permanent collections, including the Martin Kantor Portrait Prize and a photobook library.

== Venue ==
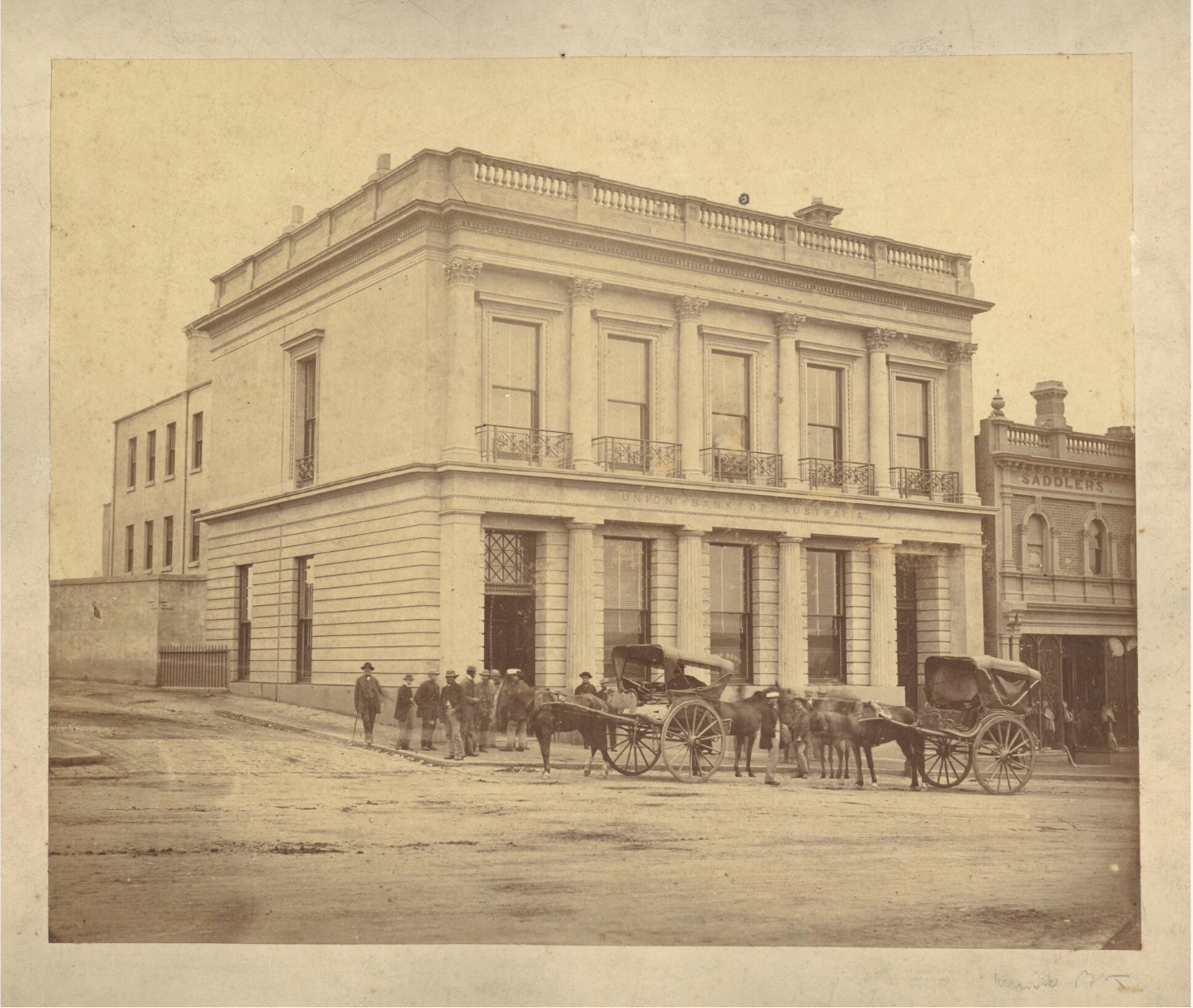
Union Bank of Australia, Ballarat, Victoria c1870, from the Richard Ledgar collection of photographs, 1858-1910, National Library of Australia

The site of the National Centre for Photography is the heritage-listed former Union Bank at 4 Bath Lane, Ballarat Central, a 436-square-metre three-story Greek Revival building. While classically inspired in form, the building stands on Wadawurrung Country, and Wadawurrung people remain the Traditional Owners of the land.

The building is considered one of the most significant works of the prolific bank and church architect, Leonard Terry (1825-1884). The ground floor features fluted Doric columns, while the upper colonnade is formed by elegant Corinthian columns supporting a richly detailed entablature and balustraded parapet. Behind the colonnades, the street façade is carefully ordered with rusticated masonry at ground level and refined upper windows with iron balconettes and diagonal transom glazing. Inside, much of the original nineteenth-century fabric survives, including the grand returning staircase, Roman-style joinery mouldings, decorative cornices and Greek-patterned frieze borders; as well as the original massive safe door.

== Exhibitions ==
=== 2026 ===
- 28 September–2 October: Ballarat Youth Photography Prize and exhibition

=== 2025 ===
Ballarat International Foto Biennale, 23 August - 19 October:

- Dave Jones with Dr Deanne Gilson, Mumu Mirri (external installation)

=== 2023 ===
Ballarat International Foto Biennale, 26 August - 22 October:

- Lisa Roet, Golden Monkey (external installation)

=== 2021 ===
Ballarat International Foto Biennale, 15 September 2021 - 9 January 2022:

- Alix Marie, Styx
- Chow and Lin (Stefen Chow and Huiyi Lin), The Poverty Line
- Steven Arnold, Notes from a Queer Mystic

=== 2019 ===
Ballarat International Foto Biennale, 24 August - 20 October:

- Robbie Rowlands, Incremental Loss Part 2
- Capital: Gabi Briggs, Peta Clancy, Mark Curran, Simryn Gill, Kristian Haggblom, Newell Harry, Lisa Hilli, Nicholas Mangan, Darren Siwes, Martin Toft, Yvonne Todd, Justine Varga and Arika Waulu. Curators Naomi Cass and Gareth Syvret.
- Mathieu Asselin, Stock Market
- Laia Abril, History of Misogyny, Chapter One: On Abortion

== See also ==
- Ballarat International Foto Biennale
- Photography in Australia
- Centre for Contemporary Photography
- Brummels Gallery
- Church Street Centre for Photography
- The Photographers' Gallery and Workshop
- Australian Centre for Photography
- Queensland Centre for Photography
- Museum of Australian Photography (MAPh)
- Ballarat
