= Château de Montaner =

Castle in Montaner in the Pyrénées-Atlantiques département of southern France

Coordinates: 43°20′57″N 0°0′45″W

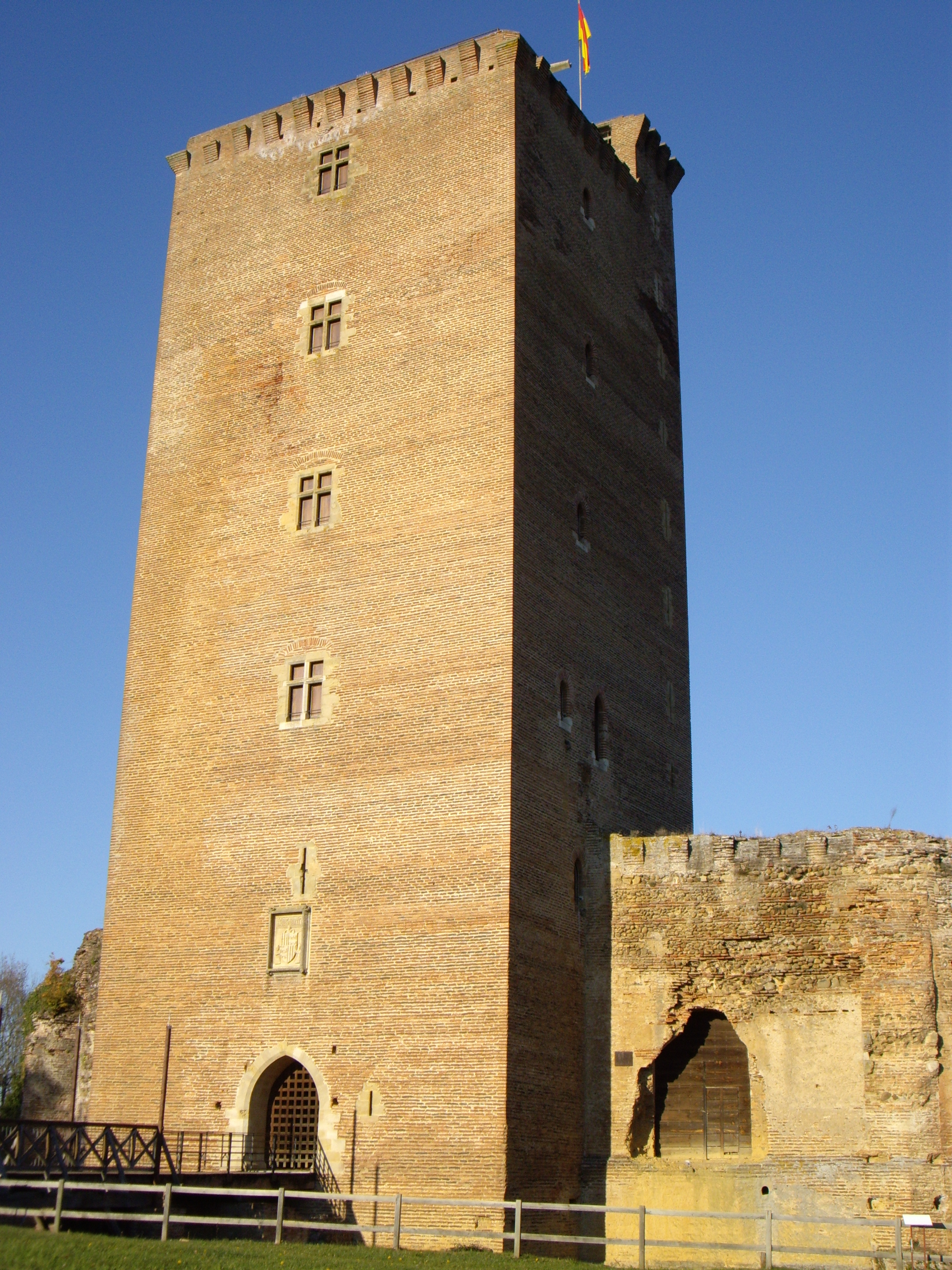
Château de Montaner

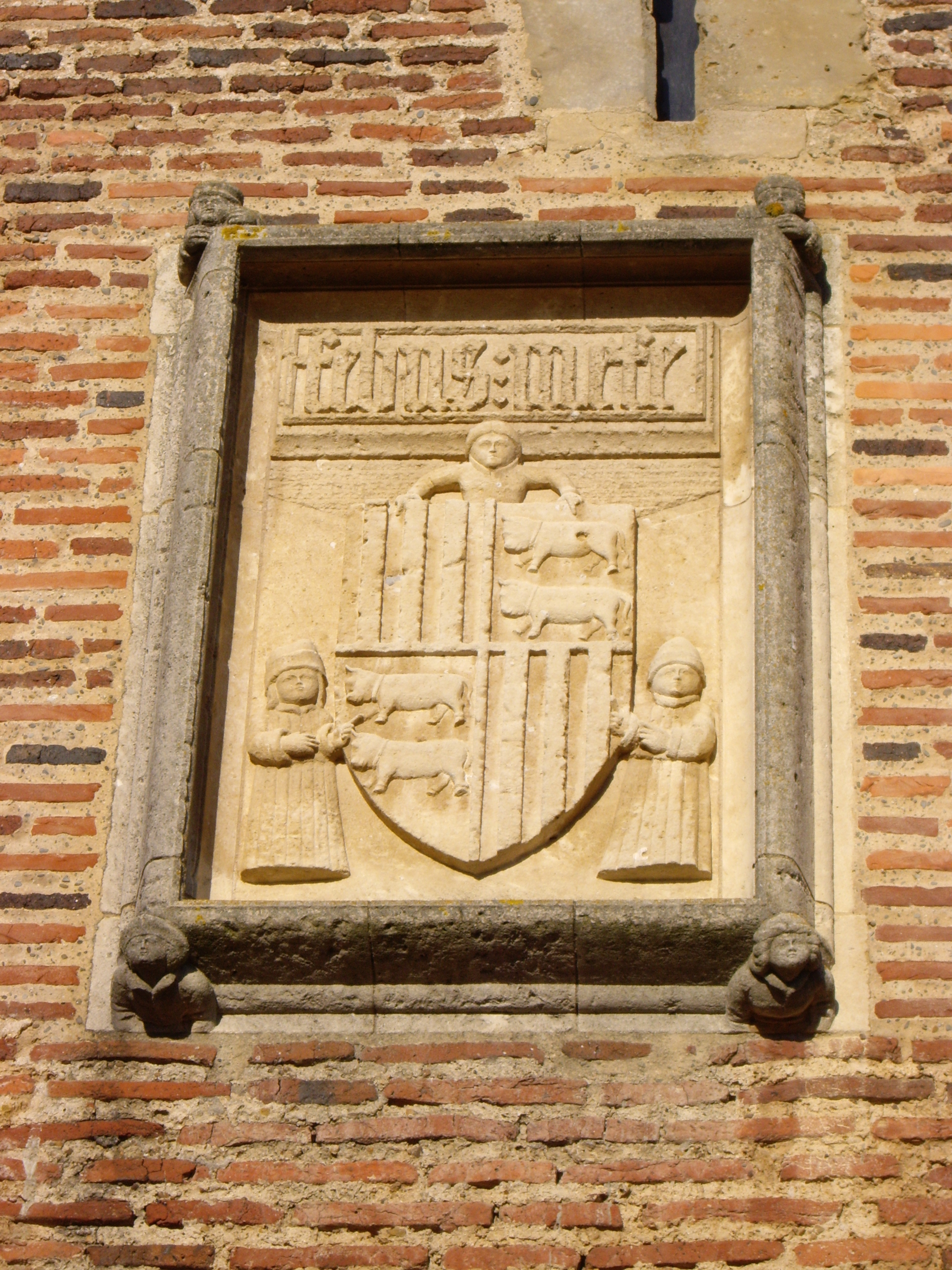
Coat of arms of Foix-Béarn

The Château de Montaner is a castle in the commune of Montaner in the Pyrénées-Atlantiques département of southern France.

A castle was built on a motte in the 11th century by the Viscounts of Montaner. It was reconstructed in 1375 by the architect Sicard de Lordat on the orders of Gaston Fébus to protect the frontiers of Béarn with Bigorre and Armagnac. Sicard de Lordat was also responsible for the Château de Pau and the Château de Morlanne and is noted for utilising brick in his constructions, its advantages being comparative cheapness and speed.

Gaston Fébus had a treaty drawn up with the local Cagots to build the framework of the château, and provide the ironworking in return for a reduction in fief taxation.

It includes a vast polygonal enceinte with 20 sections supported by buttresses with two gateways and a 36 metre high square keep, accessed by a swing bridge. Above the door to the keep is the majestic coat of arms of Foix-Béarn, itself capped with the words "Fébus mé fé" ("Fébus made me"). Since 1854, the Castle has been owned and managed by the Pyrénées-Atlantiques département. In summer, numerous spectacles and exhibitions are organised on the theme of the Middle Ages.

The castle has been listed on the French Ministry of Culture's inventory of historic buildings since 1973 and classified as a monument historique since 1980.

== See also ==
- List of castles in France
