= Morlanne =

- Commune
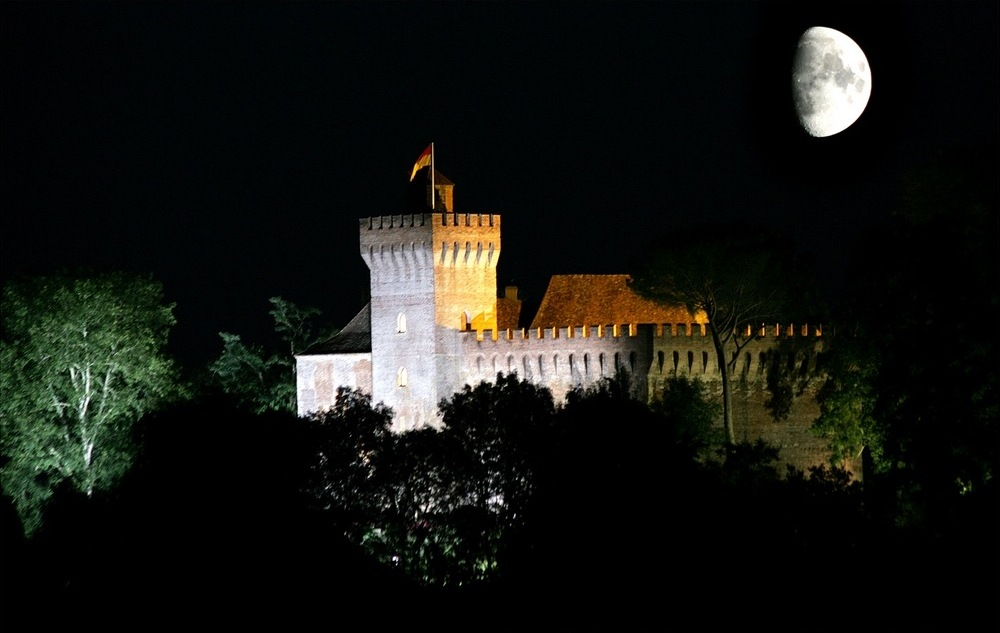
- The Château de Morlanne
- Location of Morlanne
- Location within France Location within Nouvelle-Aquitaine
- Coordinates: 43°30′51″N 0°31′59″W
- Country: France
- Region: Nouvelle-Aquitaine
- Department: Pyrénées-Atlantiques
- Arrondissement: Pau
- Canton: Artix et Pays de Soubestre
- Intercommunality: Luys en Béarn

Government
  - Mayor (2020–2026): Philippe Laborde-Rayna
- Area^{1}: 12.94 km^{2} (5.00 sq mi)
- Elevation: 190 m (620 ft)
- Highest elevation: 221 m (725 ft)
- Lowest elevation: 84 m (276 ft)
- Population (2023): 611
  - Density: 47.2/km^{2} (122/sq mi)
- Time zone: UTC+01:00 (CET)
  - Summer (DST): UTC+02:00 (CEST)
- INSEE/Postal code: 64406 /64370
- ^{1} French Land Register data, which excludes lakes, ponds, glaciers > 1 km^{2} (0.386 sq mi or 247 acres) and river estuaries.

Morlanne (French pronunciation: [mɔʁlan]; Occitan: Morlana) is a commune in the Pyrénées-Atlantiques department in south-western France. Residents are referred to as the Morlannais.

== See also ==
- Château de Morlanne
- Communes of the Pyrénées-Atlantiques department
