= Mathieu Asselin =

French-Venezuelan documentary photographer (born 1973)

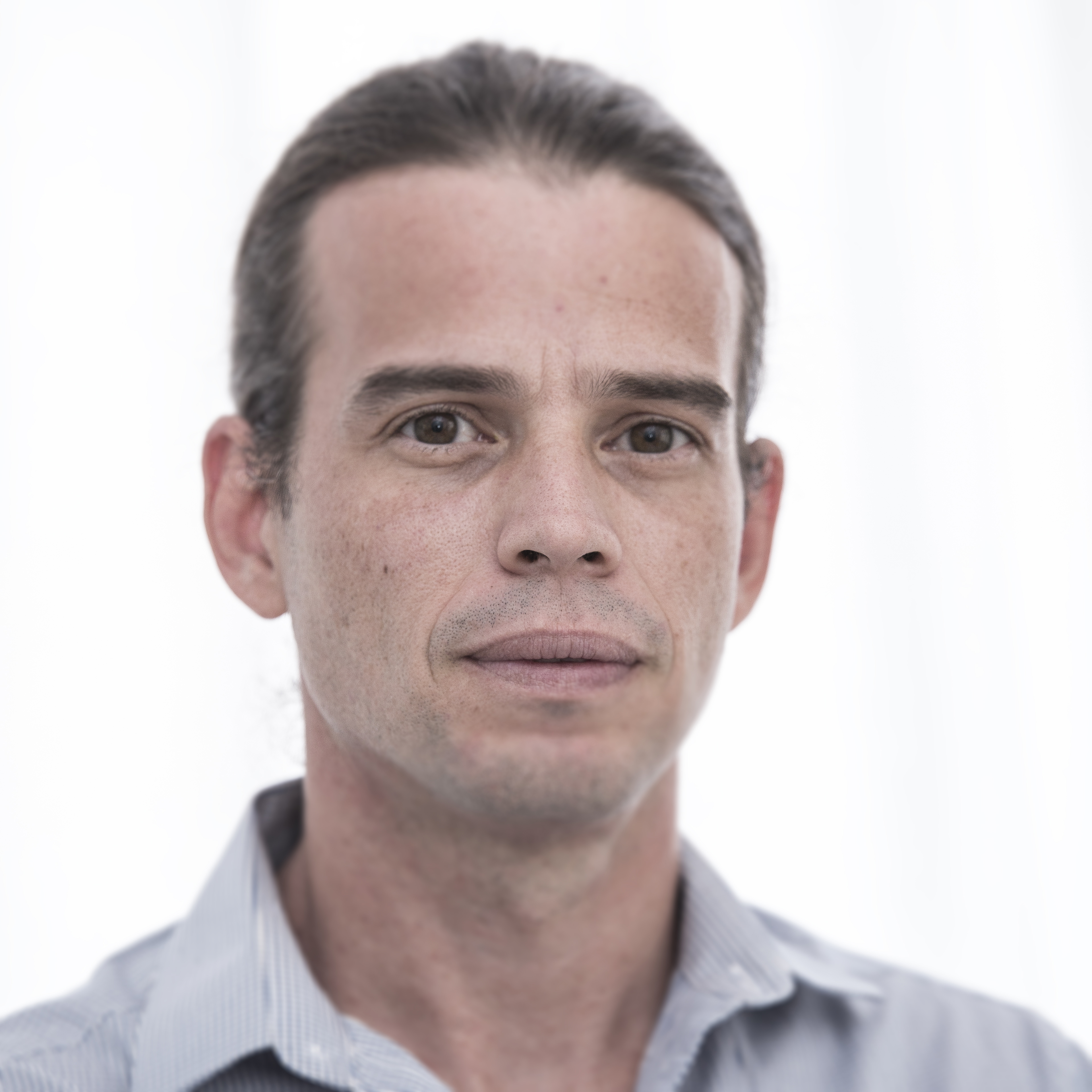
- Asselin in 2017
- Born: June 25, 1973; Aix-en-Provence, France
- Known for: Photography
- Notable work: Documentary
- Website: mathieuasselin.com

Mathieu Asselin (born 25 June 1973) is a French-Venezuelan photographer artist specializing in documentary photography and portraiture related to social issues. He is based in New York City.

In 2017 his book Monsanto: A Photographic Investigation, "a powerful indictment of corporate power and ecological irresponsibility", won the Paris Photo-Aperture Foundation First PhotoBook Award and was a finalist for the Deutsche Börse Photography Prize.

== Life and work ==
Asselin began his career working on film productions in Caracas, Venezuela and then as a photographer in Europe. He currently works as a photographer in New York City.

In 2011 Asselin photographed Occupy Wall Street protestors in Zuccotti Park, using a small open-air studio. The same year he made portraits of people who had lived through the 2011 Joplin tornado in Joplin, Missouri.

In 2014, he was Artist in Residence with Imagine Science Films.

For his book Monsanto: A Photographic Investigation, Asselin spent five years photographing the damaged landscape around Anniston, Alabama, caused by a Monsanto chemical factory. Sean O'Hagan, writing in The Guardian, described it as "a powerful indictment of corporate power and ecological irresponsibility", "a book about corporate impunity that unfolds through the deft interweaving of Asselin’s own images and a wealth of found material, from personal testimonies to courtroom files." O'hagan included it in his "best photography books of 2017".

== Publications ==
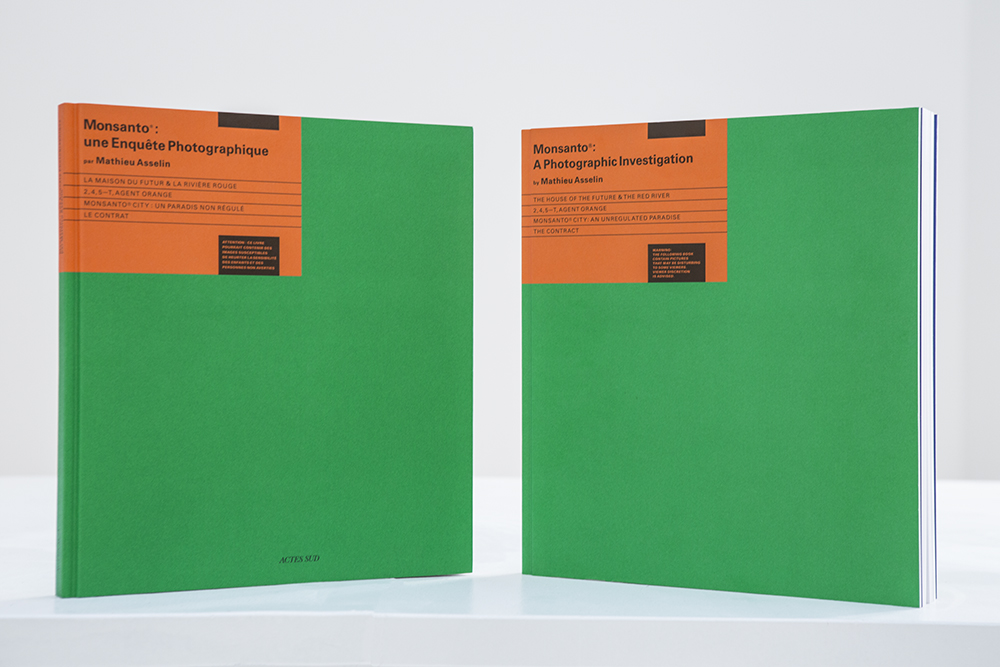
Monsanto: A Photographic Investigation.

- Monsanto: A Photographic Investigation. With the contribution of Ricardo Baez (designer) and Frédérique Wallis Davy (writer).
  - Dortmund, Germany: Kettler, 2017. ISBN 978-3-86206-657-5. English edition.
  - Monsanto: une Enquête Photographique. Arles, France: Actes Sud, 2017. ISBN 978-2-330-07805-8. French edition.

== Exhibitions ==
=== Solo exhibitions ===
- 2012: Portrait of a Tornado Path, See Gallery, New York
- 2013: Portraits of Tornado Path, Indie Gallery, Tel Aviv, Israel
- 2016: The Ninety-Nine Percent, Breda Photo Festival. Breda, Holland
- 2017: Monsanto, une enquête photographique, Rencontres d'Arles, Arles, France
- 2017: Monsanto, une enquête photographique, Hangar J1, Marseille, France
- 2019: Stock Market, National Centre for Photography during Ballarat International Foto Biennale

=== Group exhibitions ===
- Plat(t)form, Fotomuseum Winterthur, Winterthur, Switzerland, 2014

== Awards ==
- 2017: Finalist, Deutsche Börse Photography Prize for Monsanto: A Photographic Investigation
- 2017: Winner, First PhotoBook award, Paris Photo–Aperture Foundation PhotoBook Awards
