= Ann Ray =

French photographer, artist and filmmaker

- Born: Anne Deniau; 1969 (age 56–57); Brest, France
- Occupation: Photographer

Anne Deniau, known as Ann Ray, (born 1969 in Brest, France) is a French photographer, artist and filmmaker. Ann Ray has published several photographic books: Nicolas Le Riche (2008), Mira Me (2009), 24 hours in a Man's Life (2011), Love Looks Not With the Eyes (2012)—13 years of work with Lee Alexander McQueen, and Les Inachevés (2018). She is self-taught in photography except for when she studied at Central Saint Martins in London.

== Work ==
In the 1990s, she decided to follow a career as a photographer and artist. In 1995 she moved to Tokyo and in 1996 she started her photographic career.

In Tokyo, she first worked for Givenchy and Cartier. Her photographs were published in Japanese magazines such as Hi-Fashion, She, Marie-Claire, Spur, The Seine. For three months she has observed textile art in Japan, in Tokyo and Kyoto. She photographed and interviewed artisans throughout Japan.

In London, she networked with fashion designer Lee Alexander McQueen. Their relationship is documented in the 2012 book Love Looks Not With the Eyes.

In 2001, she moved to Paris. In 2003 Ray began working for the Paris Opera, producing posters, rehearsal photos, portraits, for the programmes and the magazine of the Paris Opera, entitled "Line 8" and then "On stage". She created a series of portraits of the Paris Opera Dancers for an exhibition at the Palais Garnier: Double Jeu, exhibited from 2006 to 2008, then revised and expanded from 2009 to 2012.

For more than ten years, she has collaborated with different artists and with other institutions, including the Metropolitan Opera of New York since 2006 (for which she worked on the poster for The Tempest and in 2014 Le nozze di Figaro and Cavalliera Rusticana / Pagliacci ), the Munich Opera and the Salle Pleyel in Paris.

She was signed as a photographer for the DVDs of Giselle (Paris Opera), Siddharta (Paris Opera), La Didone de Cavalli, and The Firebird/The Rite of Spring directed by Paavo Jarvi

One of her portraits was used by Michael Nyman for his CD The Piano sings (II) in 2013.

== Filmography ==
In 2006, Ray directed a film about Caligula, by Nicolas Le Riche for the Paris Opera. Also in 2006, she directed a film about Amoveo, by Benjamin Millepied, the New York City Ballet's star dancer.

In 2007, she directed a film about "Rare Differences", created by Marie-Agnès Gillot, the Paris Opera's star dancer. The film included dancers Julie Guibert and Marjorie Hannoteaux. The same year, she directed a film about Les âmes frères by Julien Lestel at Espace Cardin.

In 2010 and 2011, she produced and directed a film with Stéphane Bullion, for which the music was written by Michael Nyman. The film was part of the project "24 Hours in the Life of a Man".

Short filmography :

- 2011 24 hours in a Man's Life, art film premiere at the Opera de la Bastille
- 2014 Metamorphosis, short film with Aurélie Dupont & Jeremie Belingard, FIT, NY
- 2016 I love Writing for People I love. Film about composer Nico Muhly, Opéra de Paris
- Conversations, 2 short films about William Forsythe & Merce Cunningham, Opéra de Paris

== Publications ==
- Jacques Durand, MIRA ME!. Paris: Atlantica
- Nicholas Le Riche. Paris: Gourcuff Gradenigo, 2008
- 24 hours in a man's life. Paris: Anyway, 2011
- Love looks not with the eyes: 13 years with Alexander McQueen. Abrams, 2012.
- La Source with Christian Lacroix. Actes Sud, 2012.
- Loves is with the eyes, Lee Alexander McQueen, Paris, Martiniere, 2012
- Les Inachevés, The Unfinished, Lee McQueen, Paris: ArtCinema, 2018.

== Exhibitions ==
- 2001 Radical Fashion, Victoria & Albert Museum
- 2006 Double Game, Paris Opera
- 2008 Nicholas Le Riche
- 2018 The unfinished-Lee Mcqueen, Arles 2018 meetings, July–September 2018
- 2019 Blind Faith, Ca'Pesaro International Gallery of Modern Art, Venice April–June 2019
- 2019 Ann Ray & Lee McQueen: Rendez-vous, Barrett Barrera Projects, St Louis
