= Bonnemazon =

- Commune
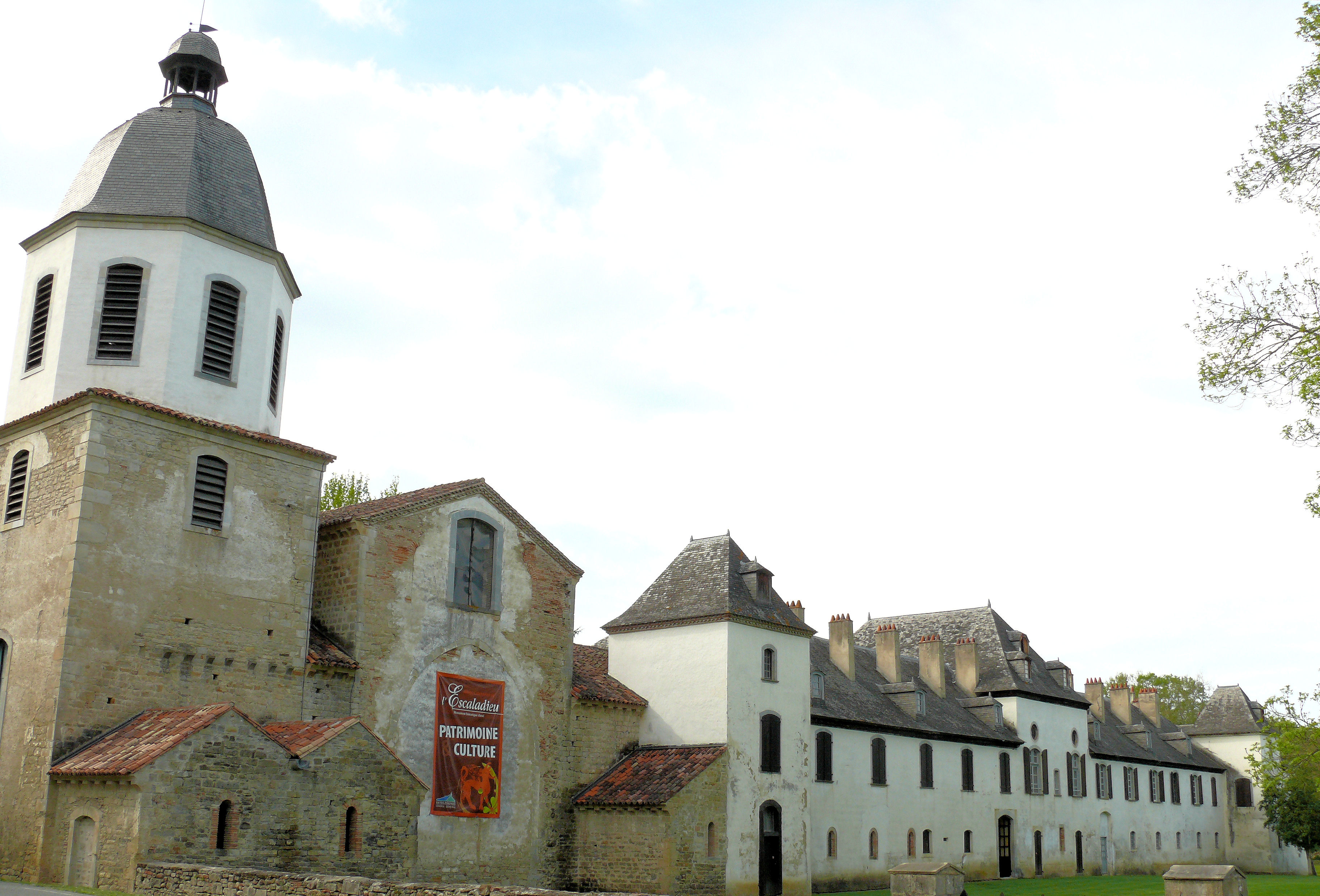
- Escaladieu Abbey

- Coat of arms
- Location of Bonnemazon
- Location within France Location within Occitanie
- Coordinates: 43°06′14″N 0°16′13″E
- Country: France
- Region: Occitania
- Department: Hautes-Pyrénées
- Arrondissement: Bagnères-de-Bigorre
- Canton: La Vallée de l'Arros et des Baïses

Government
  - Mayor (2020–2026): Jean Marc Bégué
- Area^{1}: 5 km^{2} (1.9 sq mi)
- Elevation: 400 m (1,300 ft)
- Highest elevation: 513 m (1,683 ft)
- Lowest elevation: 307 m (1,007 ft)
- Population (2023): 69
  - Density: 14/km^{2} (36/sq mi)
- Time zone: UTC+01:00 (CET)
  - Summer (DST): UTC+02:00 (CEST)
- INSEE/Postal code: 65096 /65130
- ^{1} French Land Register data, which excludes lakes, ponds, glaciers > 1 km^{2} (0.386 sq mi or 247 acres) and river estuaries.

Bonnemazon (French pronunciation: [bɔnmazɔ̃]; Occitan: Bonamason) is a commune in the Hautes-Pyrénées department in southwestern France.

== Population ==
Historical population
Year	Pop.	±% p.a.
1968	111	—
1975	95	−2.20%
1982	98	+0.45%
1990	82	−2.20%
1999	73	−1.28%
2007	69	−0.70%
2012	75	+1.68%
2017	64	−3.12%
2023	69	+1.26%
Source: INSEE

== See also ==
- Communes of the Hautes-Pyrénées department
