= Flaran Abbey =

Abbey in Gers, France

Coordinates: 43°53′23″N 0°22′23″E

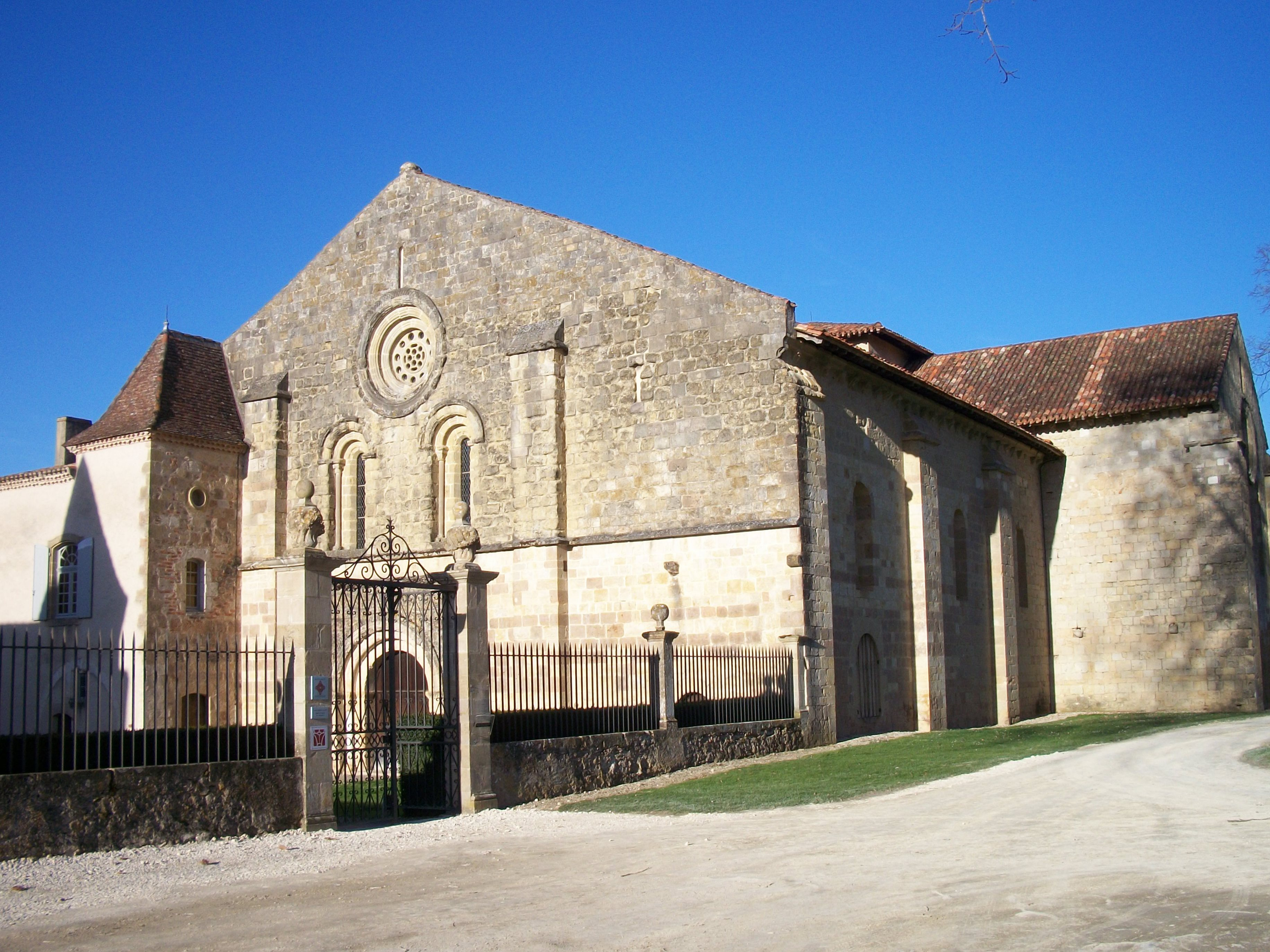
Roman church and iron gate of Flaran Abbey.

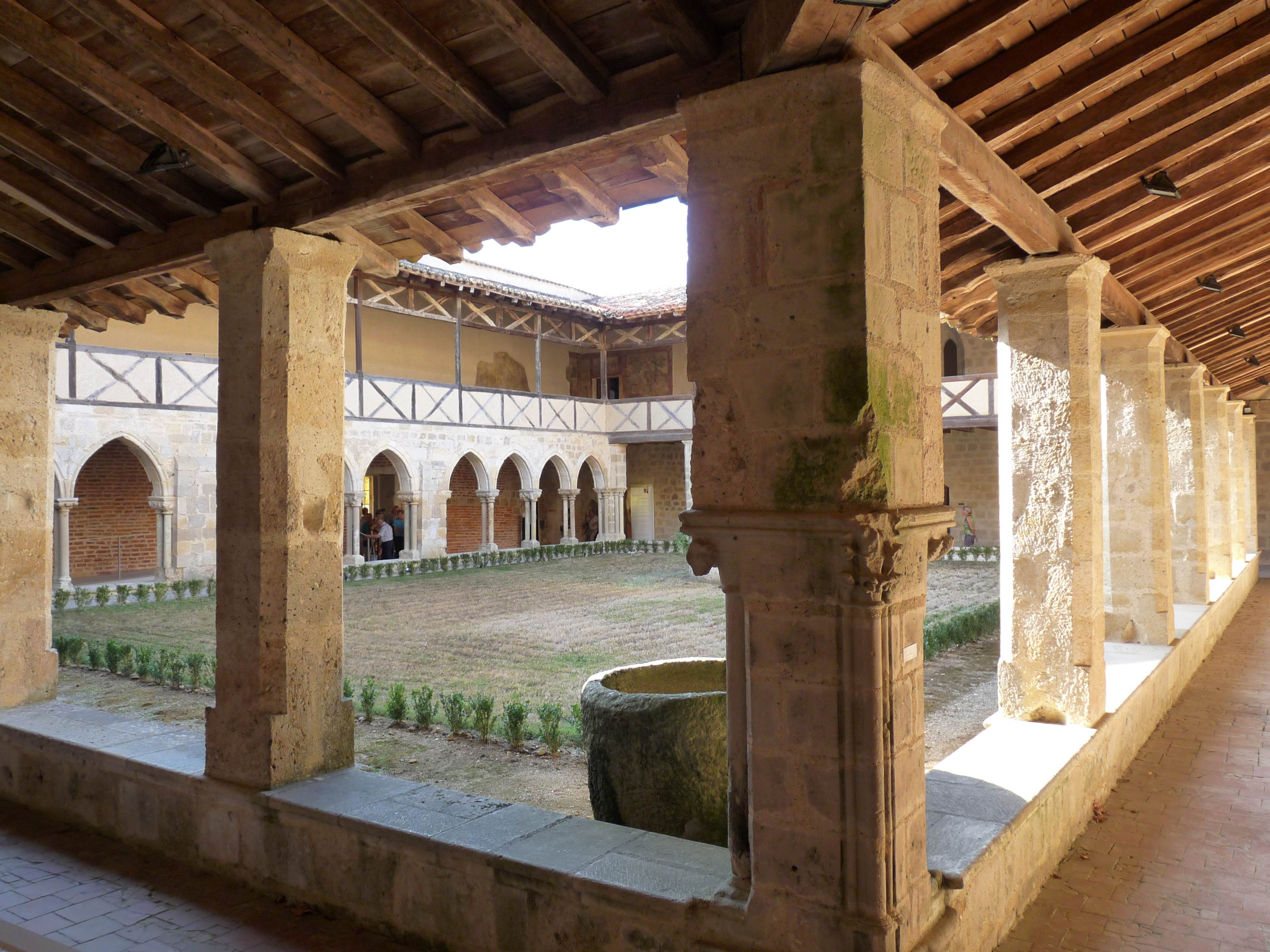
Cloister of Flaran Abbey.

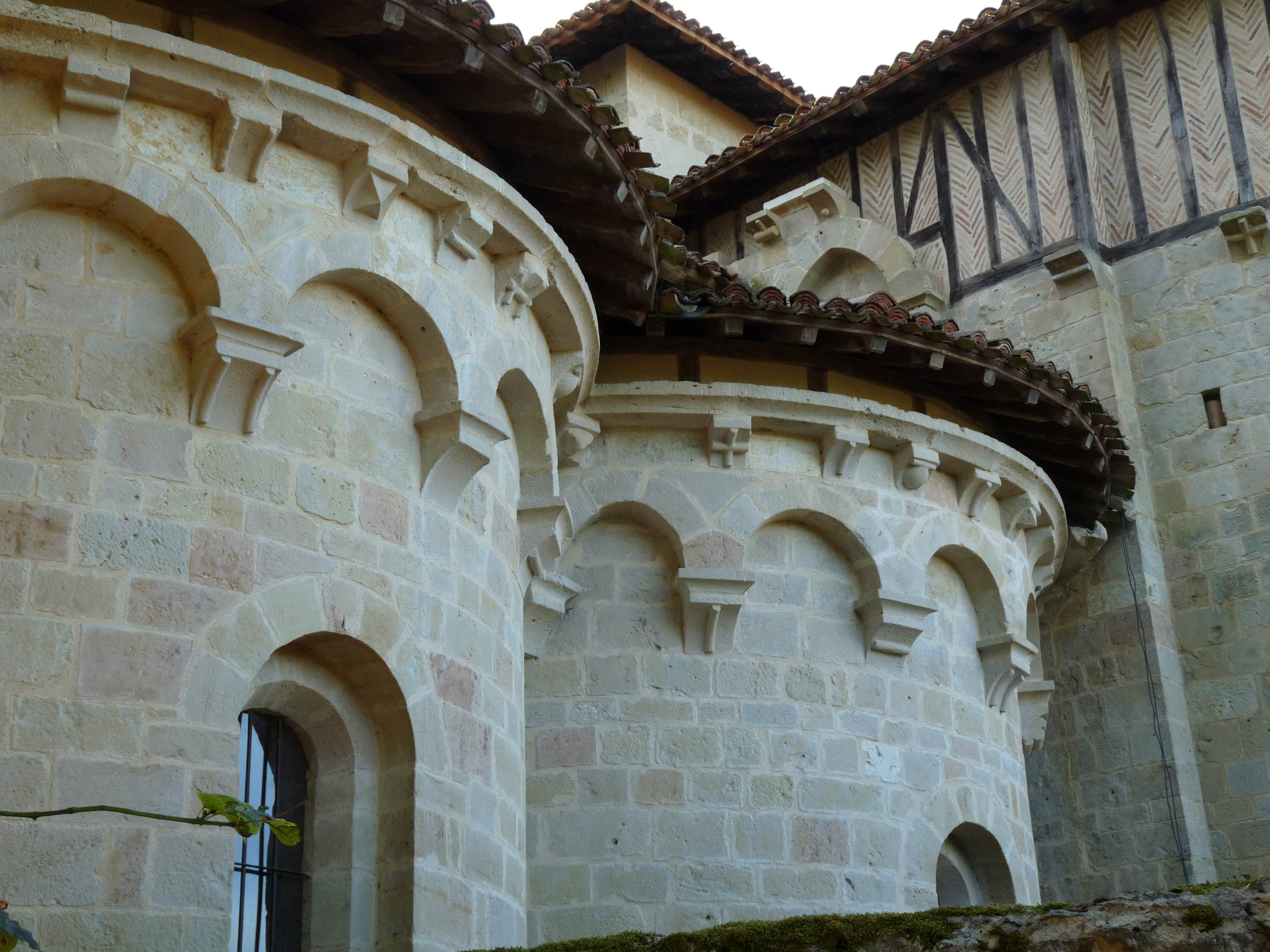
Restored stonework of the church apse.

Flaran Abbey is a former Cistercian abbey located near Valence-sur-Baïse, in the département of Gers, France. The abbey was founded in 1151, as a daughter house of Escaladieu Abbey, at the confluence of the Auloue and Baïse rivers, between the towns of Condom and Auch. The abbey was founded by Burgundian monks and today represents one of the best preserved abbeys in the south-west of France.

== History ==
After its foundation in the 12th century, Flaran Abbey experienced rapid growth. In the middle of the 13th century, the abbey, jointly with Gerald V, Count of Armagnac, founded the fortified town of Valence-sur-Baïse on a hillside on the other side of the Baïse river.

The abbey did not escape the vicissitudes of history, beginning with the Hundred Years' War, which ended with the Plantagenet county of Gascony being realigned with France. Engulfed by fire during the French Wars of Religion, the abbey was restored by subsequent abbots, but was suppressed and sold off during the French Revolution.

In 1913, the Archaeological Society of Gers intervened so that the abbey would not end up in the architectural collection of George Grey Barnard that resulted in The Cloisters museum in New York City.

The site was purchased by the department of Gers in 1972 and underwent an intense restoration project; it is now the site of numerous cultural activities. The site houses a permanent exhibition on the pilgrimage route to Santiago de Compostela, the Way of St. James.
