= Valence-sur-Baïse =

- Commune
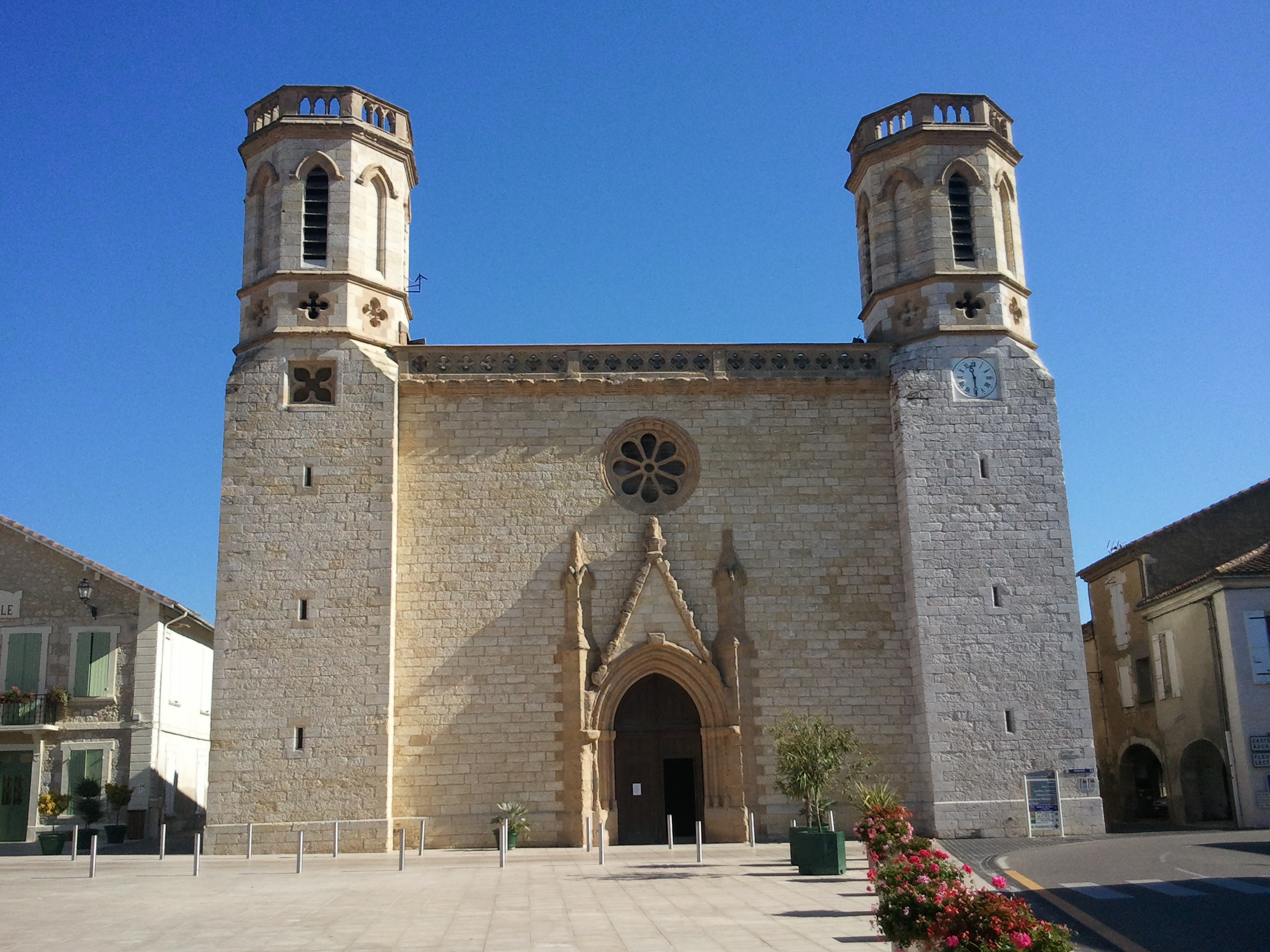
- The church

- Coat of arms
- Location of Valence-sur-Baïse
- Location within France Location within Occitanie
- Coordinates: 43°52′59″N 0°22′56″E
- Country: France
- Region: Occitania
- Department: Gers
- Arrondissement: Condom
- Canton: Baïse-Armagnac

Government
  - Mayor (2020–2026): Marie-Thérèse Broca-Lannaud
- Area^{1}: 27.6 km^{2} (10.7 sq mi)
- Elevation: 110 m (360 ft)
- Highest elevation: 201 m (659 ft)
- Lowest elevation: 75 m (246 ft)
- Population (2023): 1,147
  - Density: 41.6/km^{2} (108/sq mi)
- Time zone: UTC+01:00 (CET)
  - Summer (DST): UTC+02:00 (CEST)
- INSEE/Postal code: 32459 /32310
- ^{1} French Land Register data, which excludes lakes, ponds, glaciers > 1 km^{2} (0.386 sq mi or 247 acres) and river estuaries.

Valence-sur-Baïse (pronounced [valɑ̃s syʁ baiːz]; Gascon: Valença de Baïsa) is a commune in the Gers department in southwestern France.

== Geography ==
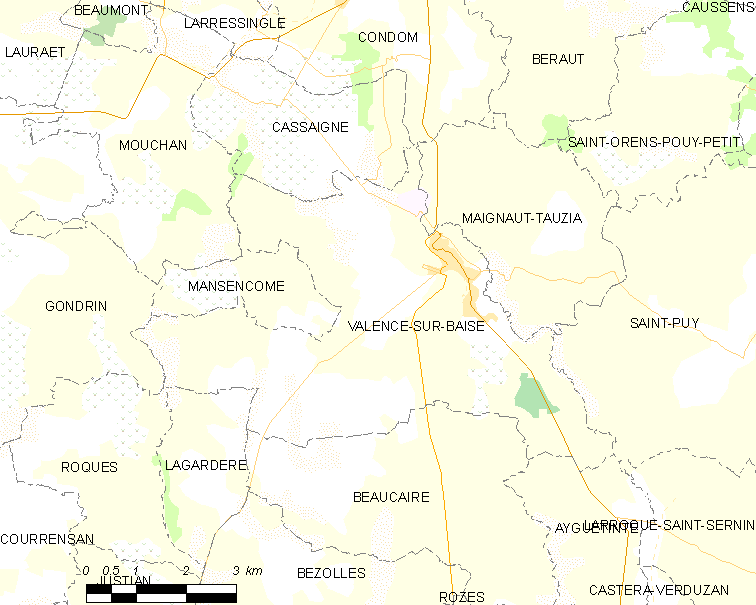
Valence-sur-Baïse and its surrounding communes

== Population ==
Historical population
Year	Pop.	±% p.a.
1968	1,229	—
1975	1,256	+0.31%
1982	1,216	−0.46%
1990	1,157	−0.62%
1999	1,151	−0.06%
2007	1,199	+0.51%
2012	1,136	−1.07%
2017	1,135	−0.02%
2023	1,147	+0.18%
Source: INSEE

== See also ==
- Communes of the Gers department
- Flaran Abbey
- Baïse
