= Natacha Lesueur =

French photographer and plasticist

- Born: 1 August 1971; Cannes Alpes-Maritimes, France
- Education: Villa Arson
- Occupations: Photographer; Plastic artist
- Awards: "Prix Ricard" (2000); Villa Medici artist in residence (2002-2003)

Natacha Lesueur (born 1 August 1971) is a French photographer and plasticist.

She lives and works in Paris.

== Life ==
Lesueur was born at Cannes. She studied not at a photography academy but at the Villa Arson ("École Nationale Supérieure d'Arts à la Villa Arson") in Nice. While there she came to the realisation that photography would become her principal artistic medium. Her first personal exhibition took place in 1996. In 2000 she was a winner of the "Prix Ricard", and she was visual artist in residence at the Villa Medici during 2002/03. She has exhibited in a number of European countries, in the United States of America, South Korea and China. A retrospective of her work was produced by the Museum of Modern and Contemporary Art in Geneva in 2011.

Natacha Lesueur teaches at the Cantonal Art College at Lausanne and at the European Academy of Art at Rennes.

== Work ==
You don't produce so many photo-works?

- "I do 15 - 20 images per year. The thing comes together right at the end of the composition process - which can take a long time. There's no shortage of images these days: I try and make mine meaningful and essential, at least for me. With my last piece, hairstyles depicted in black and white paint, I think there cannot have been more than five images. That takes a lot of time, the molds, the coiffures ... all that for a single 'photo'!"
- "Je fais 15 à 20 images par an. La prise arrive toujours en fin de processus de fabrication, qui peut être très long. On ne manque pas d’images de nos jours : je cherche à ce que les miennes soient essentielles, au moins pour moi. Avec mon dernier travail, des coiffures maquillées en peinture noir et blanc, je pense qu’il y aura seulement cinq images. Cela prend beaucoup de temps, les moules, la coiffure, le blanc complet, tout cela pour une seule photo !"
Natacha Lesueur, interviewed by Clémentine Mercier in Libération, 2015

Since 1993 the starting point for Natacha Lesueur's artistic output has been photographic. But even if the photography, in the final analysis, determines its own interaction with the finished piece, the structure of the work is built up like a painting in a succession of layers. The photographic image ends up fulfilling the role of a varnish on the totality of the composition. Many of her artistic priorities express themselves through the body, the appearance of its structure, and the intimate association sustained between flesh and food.

Lesueur produces a series, whereby her works follow one another but without overtly resembling one another, unfolding in seemingly infinite variety, in terms of themes, trompe-l'œil and optical traps that resonate between each other to create an overall unity. Half of her photographic output juxtaposes the body with food. Examples include "aspics en guise de bonnets de bain" ("Aspics in the form of bathing caps" - 1997/98), "Peau de saumon comme résille de chignon" (Salmon skins as fishing nets), "ambes gainées de crépine de porc " ("Legs wrapped in membranes of pork" - 1997/98), "bouches dont les dents sont des graines de toutes sortes" ("human mouths with a diversity of seeds in place of teeth" - 2000). In other images women's bodies are marked with pearl imprints (1994–96), with eye-test charts (2000-2001), with a sleeping man's face inscribed with a pen (2004), carved finger nails (1997-2003), or women whose teeth are varnished with red, bursting into laughter. In a series she created between 2009 and 2011 she worked with the same fortyish year old model who was pregnant during (some of) this time, to re-evaluate the figure of the Brazilian actress Carmen Miranda, formerly used by Hollywood as an exotic caricature "prototype". She uses the body as a "writing/drawing surface" and a semi-regular backing for images of culinary preparations, footprints and/or portrait-sculptures.
