= Isabelle Massieu =

French traveler, writer and photographer

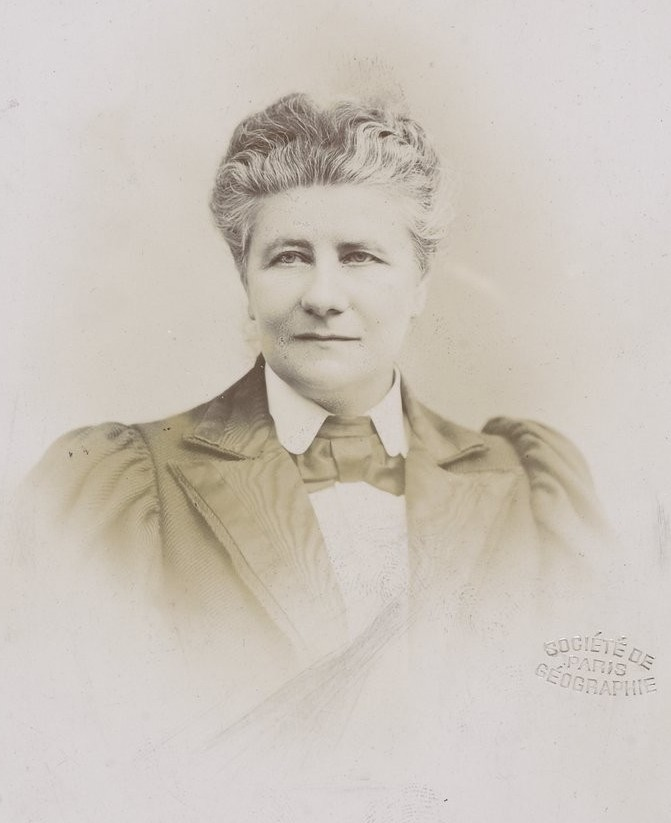
- Born: Isabelle Massieu Bauche; 3 April 1844
- Died: 1932
- Occupations: writer, photographer
- Spouse: Jacques Alexandre Octave Massieu
- Awards: Legion of Honor

Isabelle Massieu (born Bauche, 3 April 1844 - 1932) was a French traveler, writer and photographer. Massieu became the first French woman to travel to Nepal, which she wrote about in Népal et pays himalayens. She became a member of the Legion of Honor in 1906.

== Biography ==
Massieu was born in Paris on 3 April 1844. She married a lawyer, Jacques Alexandre Octave Massieu, who took her on his trips through Europe and the Middle East. When she was widowed at the age of 50, Massieu continued to travel. Starting in 1892, she began to travel to Asia. She traveled through French Indo-China and British-ruled Burma in 1896. She released an account of her travels to India in "A Frenchwoman at Ladak." Massieu became the first French woman to travel to Nepal. She described her journey in 1908 to Nepal, through India, Bhutan and Sikkim and into Tibet in the book, Népal et pays himalayens.

Massieu became a Legion of Honor member in 1906. Massieu died in 1932 and was buried in the Carnot cemetery in Suresnes. Some of her photographs are part of the collection of the Musée de l'Homme.
