= Ballarat International Foto Biennale =

International photography festival in Victoria, Australia

The Ballarat International Foto Biennale is a 60-day festival of photography held every two years in the city of Ballarat, in regional Victoria, Australia. The Biennale is presented by the not-for-profit organisation Ballarat International Foto Biennale Inc. The festival delivers a curated program showcasing significant Australian and international artists, with recent highlights including Campbell Addy and Robert Mapplethorpe in 2025, Platon in 2023, Linda McCartney in 2021, Liu Bolin in 2019, and David LaChappelle in 2017.

== History ==
The Biennale was founded by photographer and curator Jeff Moorfoot OAM in Daylesford in 2005, returning in 2007. In 2009 the festival relocated to the city of Ballarat, where it has continued. Moorfoot remained as Director, overseeing successive festivals in 2011, 2013, and 2015, before stepping down in 2015. Moorfoot returned for the 2023 festival as guest curator of the core exhibition The Real Thing.

Fiona Sweet was appointed as CEO and Artistic Director of the Biennale in 2016, and continued in the role through to 2021, overseeing successive festivals in 2017, 2019, and 2021. Sweet undertook the site purchase for the National Centre for Photography, with the assistance of donor funding.

Vanessa Gerrans, previously director at Warrnambool Art Gallery, was appointed as CEO and Artistic Director of the Biennale in 2022, and has overseen successive festivals in 2023 and 2025. Gerrans has overseen the design and development of the National Centre for Photography, with Stage One Development completion expected in early 2026.

== Program and impact ==
The Ballarat International Foto Biennale features a curated 'Core Program' of leading Australian and international photographic artists, presented in prominent landmark buildings throughout Ballarat including the Ballarat Mining Exchange, the Ballarat Town Hall and the Art Gallery of Ballarat. This Core Program is complemented by a community access 'Open Program', a city-wide presentation of over 200 artists staged in more than 80 venues including cafes and galleries, project spaces, and public sites.

The Biennale exhibitions are complemented by an Events Program that encourages an egalitarian interface with participation of the public and of photographic practitioners of all levels through its program of workshops, seminars, audio-visual projections, master-classes, artist floor-talks, portfolio reviews, an education program and photographic competitions and prizes.

=== 2025 Festival ===
In 2025, the Ballarat International Foto Biennale was held over 60 days from Saturday 23 August to Sunday 19 October, with core exhibitions showcasing the work of British-Ghanaian photographer Campbell Addy, documentation of the Vietnam War by French photojournalist Catherine Leroy, and works by the iconic US photographer Robert Mapplethorpe, curated by Edward Enninful, stylist and former editor of Vogue magazine.

=== 2023 Festival ===
In 2023, the Ballarat International Foto Biennale held its 10th festival. The festival launched on Saturday 26 August and ran until Sunday 22 October. This festival was celebrated as a major milestone for Ballarat Foto and brought in 39,228 visitors to look at the work of 437 artists. The theme for the 2023 festival was The Real Thing which prompted a profound exploration of reality in today’s world. The program featured British photographer Platon, Polaroid portraits by US artist and filmmaker Andy Warhol, and Swedish artist Erik Johansson.

=== 2021 Festival ===
The 9th Ballarat International Foto Biennale festival showcased the works of Linda McCartney: Retrospective following along the 2021 theme of Past, Present, Now. Due to the impact of COVID-19 and consequential government restrictions, the festival was extended until Sunday 9 January 2022, with a total attendance of over 26,200 visitors.

=== 2019 Festival ===
The 8th Ballarat International Foto Biennale, in2019, launched on Saturday 24 August and ran until Sunday 20 October. Exhibiting works of artists who represented their worlds in unconventional ways and in unpredictable circumstances, in line with the theme Hello World, the festival attracted 37,846 visitors and the event was extended to its new length of 60 days for the first time. Headlining this festival was Chinese 'concealment' artist Liu Bolin who showcased Camouflage, an exhibition of works from the past 15 years of his artistic practice.

=== 2017 Festival ===
The 2017 7th Ballarat International Foto Biennale headlined the work of David LaChapelle with an additional 200+ artists whose work surrounded the theme of Performance of Identity. The festival ran from Saturday 19 August until Sunday 17 September, where Ballarat Foto greeted 26,800+ festival visitors throughout the 2017 festival.

=== 2015 Festival ===
The 2015 6th Ballarat International Foto Biennale ran from Saturday 22 August until Sunday 20 September. Featuring the work of Nan Goldin and David Goldblatt, the 2015 festival focused on the theme of A World of ideas, thus including a range of projects highlighting social and cultural issues.

=== 2013 Festival ===
The 2013 festival was the 5th festival for Ballarat International Foto Biennale. Opening on Saturday 17 August the festival ran until Sunday 15 September. Showcasing the work of photographer John Cato and photographer Gregory Cewdson for the 29 day duration of the festival, and circling around the theme of The Changing World, the works shown in the 2013 festival demonstrated international photography coinciding with the impact of global shifts.

=== 2011 Festival ===
Ballarat International Foto Biennale’s 4th festival featured photographers including Peter Lik and William Eggleston circling around the theme of The Future of Photography. Exhibiting work of emerging artists alongside the headlining photographers, the 2011 festival opened on Saturday 20 August remaining open for visitors until Sunday 18 September.

=== 2009 Festival ===
Held from Saturday 4 September to Sunday 4 October, this was the third biennial festival and the first to run under the new name and at its new home, Ballarat International Foto Biennale. Intending to brand the festival as an international event with high community engagement the theme for this festival was The Big Picture. Showcasing works from 100+ artists alongside, panels, artist talks, workshops and events.

=== 2007 Festival ===
Known as Daylesford Foto Biennale, the second international festival of photography took place from Saturday 2 June to Sunday 1 July. The festival was held in Daylesford, Victoria, Australia.

=== 2005 Festival ===
The festival's debut was in Daylesford running from Saturday 3 June to Sunday 3 July 2005. The 2005 Festival established a foundation that went on to support the event’s expansion and continuation.

=== The National Centre for Photography ===
In 2018, Ballarat International Foto Biennale purchased the heritage-listed Union Bank building at 4 Bath Lane, Ballarat Central, to establish a centre for photographic excellence in Ballarat. With funding of $6.7 million from the Victorian State Government’s Tourism Infrastructure Fund announced in November 2020, work has commenced on the restoration and development of the building for Stage One of the National Centre for Photography project. The National Centre for Photography will be Australia’s newest and only regional gallery dedicated exclusively to photography and visual imaging culture, with Stage One Development scheduled to be completed in early 2026.

== Governance, ambassadors and memberships ==
=== Board of Directors ===
The Ballarat International Foto Biennale Inc. is governed by a ten-member Board of Directors, supported by the Arts Advisory Subcommittee, the Fundraising Campaign Subcommittee, and the National Centre for Photography Subcommittee. The current Board members include Alicia Linley, Chair; Leila Chalk, Secretary; Karla Treweek, Treasurer; and Francesca Carter, James Remington, Joseph van Dyk and Chris Whitfield.

=== Ambassadors ===
The Ballarat International Foto Biennale is represented and promoted by a body of Ambassadors, including:

- The Hon. Stephen Bracks AC
- Nici Cumpston OAM
- Warren Ellis
- City of Ballarat Mayor Cr Tracey Hargreaves
- Her Honour Judge Sara Hinchey
- Peter Jopling AM KC
- Kate Torney OAM
- James Valentine
- Andrew Walsh AO

=== Memberships ===
The Ballarat International Foto Biennale is a founding member (2010) of the Asia Pacific Photoforum, and hosted the organisation's Annual General Meeting in Ballarat in 2023. The Biennale is also a member by invitation of the International Biennial Association, and the International Photography Festivals Association; and is the only Oceanic member of the Festival of Light association of photography festivals.
