= Gaëlle Ghesquière =

French photographer, journalist, and author

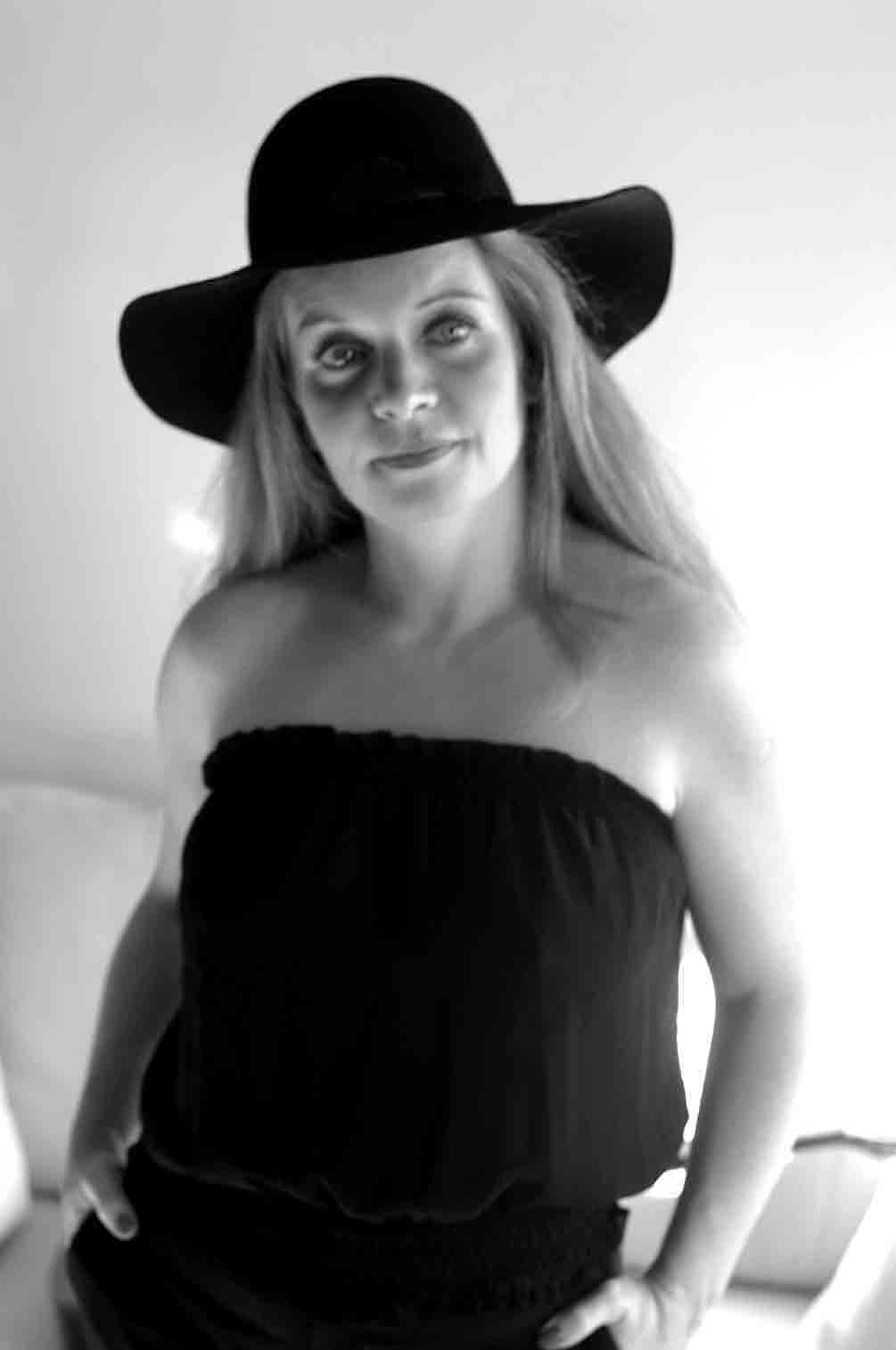
- Born: 22 January 1972 (age 54); Maubeuge, France
- Occupations: Photo-journalist and author of books
- Known for: Photographing pop-rock artists

Gaëlle Ghesquière is a French photographer, journalist, and author who has achieved fame photographing pop-rock artists on stage such as Madonna, Mick Jagger, David Bowie, Ben Harper, Lenny Kravitz, James Brown, and many more.

== Biography ==
Ghesquière was born in Maubeuge in northern France and has lived in Somme, Oise, and Paris. During her college education in literature, she wrote a thesis on the Walloon-Picard language then joined the newspapers Le Figaro and France Soir as an intern and did freelance work. In 1995, she became a photographer by chance. The newspaper Le Figaro she was working for accredited her, as compensation for her pay, to cover the musical concert of the Red Hot Chili Peppers at the Zenith where she took pictures with an instant camera. The photographs she took at the concert drew the attention of Philippe Manoeuvre, the founder of the magazine Rock & Folk. She was then assigned to work in a series of collaborations on concerts of Tina Turner, David Bowie, Lenny Kravitz, and many others. Madonna had chosen Ghesquière in 2000 to take her pictures and promote her music album.

Following her initial success, Ghesquière has worked with Rock & Folk magazine, Ride On, Blast, etc., and for many newspapers. She had spent more than 20 years taking photographs of famous rock stars at the concerts which have appeared on music album covers. On the other hand, she has authored many books on her experience with rock culture and pop-rock artists. She has also published books titled Rock with Me and Rock Access or Behind the Scenes in which she has presented portrait pictures of famous rock artists from Lou Reed to Madonna. In the book "Rock with Me" she presented more than 500 images of famous pop artists which included names like James Brown, Rolling Stones, David Bowie, Patti Smith, AC / DC. The book presents her appreciation of some aspects of the personality of rock stars.

== Exhibitions ==
Ghesquière has held exhibitions of her artwork. Some of them are:

- 2004 50 Ans du rock, House of live à Paris 8ème.
- 2008 Gaëlle Ghesquière, Paris golf & Country club
- 2010 The Rétrospective of Rolling Stones / Renoma
- 2010 Who's rock, Galerie Binôme
- 2011 Festival Images en Scène, La Roche Posay
- 2011: Exhibition Who's rock ? chez Rockstar, Paris.
- 2012: Exhibition Who's rock ? à Seyssel.
- 2013: Exhibition "Les Icônes du Rock" à Étrœungt
- 2013: Exhibition "ROCK ACCESS" à Paris Galerie BATIGNOLLE'S ART
- 2014: Exhibition conférence "les légendes du Rock" Maubeuge Maison Folie,
- 2015: Exhibition conférence "Les légendes du Rock" Lillers
- 2016: Exhibition à THE BLACK GALLERY Place des Vosges- Paris
- 2017: Exhibition ROCK with ME à Noyon

== Publications ==
Some of Ghesquière's published books are:

- All Access (De la scène aux coulisses de la pop) (2003)
- All Events All Access (2004)
- Ben Harper in Live(2005) (French Edition)
- Who's rock? (2008) (French Edition)
- Rock with Me(2016) (French Edition)
