= Marguerite Bornhauser =

French visual artist and photographer

- Born: 1989 (age 36–37); France
- Education: Sorbonne, Weißensee Academy of Art Berlin
- Occupations: Visual artist, photographer

Marguerite Bornhauser (born 1989), is a French visual artist and photographer.

== Early life and education ==
Marguerite Bornhauser studied literature and journalism at the Sorbonne. She is the daughter of a poet father and a painter mother. In 2014, she participated in a residency at the Weißensee Academy of Art Berlin. In 2015, she graduated from the École nationale supérieure de la photographie in Arles.

== Career ==
Marguerite Bornhauser mainly uses a colorful palette and bright tones. She regularly accompanies her photographic research with editorial work. In 2015, she published a first work in self-publication. In the same year, Plastic Colors was selected among the ten finalists for the First Book Award, presented by the MACK publishing house. The book is published in 2017.

In 2019, Margueritte Bornhauser presented her first solo exhibition Moisson Rouge, in a French institution, at the Maison européenne de la photographie. The project mixed abstract compositions and close-ups. The uncaptioned images carry elusive meanings. The photographer said: "I often use images as words to tell stories, create fictions and particular atmospheres ". She also confronted, in the form of diptychs, images taken at different periods.

As a continuation of this exhibition, she published the book Moisson Rouge (Red Harvest), published by Poursuite, in which she immortalized nature as an enigmatic, dreamlike and colorful universe. The title of the book refers to the work Red Harvest by Dashiell Hammett, an American screenwriter and novelist, considered to be the founder of the roman noir.

Her artistic work has been presented in meetings and exhibitions around the world, such as in the streets of Cincinnati in the United States, at the Rencontres de la Photographie in Arles, at the Festival Planches Contact in Deauville or in the BETC and Agnès B galleries in Paris.

In 2020, Margueritte Bornhauser is the winner of the Emerging Photographer Award from Photo London.

== Exhibitions ==
- Red Harvest, Maison Européenne de la Photographie, Paris, 5 June to 14 July 2019

== Awards ==
- 2020 : London Emerging Photographer Award

== Publications ==
- Plastic Colors, Lic Edition, in association with Galerie Madé, 32p, 2017, (ISBN 978-82-93341-21-5)
- 8, Continuation Edition, 60 pages, November 2018, (ISBN 978-2-490140-13-8)
- Red Harvest, Marguerite Bornhauser, text by Simon Baker, Continued Edition, 32 pages, November 2019, (ISBN 9782490140176)
