= Laure Mathilde Gouin =

French painter and photographer (1829–1916)

- Born: 14 December 1829; Paris, France
- Died: October 4, 1916 (aged 86); Paris, France
- Other names: Laure Mathilde Braquehais Madame M. Gouin
- Occupation(s): Painter and photographer.

Laure Mathilde Gouin (married name Braquehais; 14 December 1829 – 4 October 1916) was a French painter and photographer. She worked as a colourist for her father, painter Alexis Gouin and with her husband photographer Bruno Braquehais, and from 1874 worked independently under the name of Madame (Mme.) M. Gouin.

== Early life and marriage ==
Laure Mathilde Gouin was born in Paris on 14 December 1829, the daughter of Marie Catherine Bellange Gellé and her husband Alexis Louis Charles Arthur Gouin. Her father was deaf and had been born in New York, the son of colonists from Saint-Domingue. Initially a painter, he became a photographer around 1847, first at 50, rue Basse-du-Rempart, then at 37, rue Louis-le-Grand. He produced portraits and female nudes in the form of painted daguerreotypes. Marie and Laure Matilde Gouin assisted him, the former with photography, the latter as a daguerreotype colourist, but their work was not formally recognised at the time. As the journalist Ernest Lacan noted after Alexis Gouin's death in La Lumière magazine, "when it came to collecting praise, [mother and daughter] let their cooperation go unnoticed".

In July 1850, Laure Mathilde Gouin married Bruno Braquehais in Paris and became known as Mme Braquehais. Her new husband had been born in Dieppe in 1823, and was deaf like her father. Braquehais had been a lithographer in Caen, before setting up as a painter and photographer at 10, place de la Madeleine in Paris. After their marriage, he moved into The Gouin home at 37, rue Louis-le-Grand. Around 1852, he moved his studio to 110, rue de Richelieu where he produced portraits and nudes, used in particular by painters as preparatory studies.

== Death of and succession to Alexis Gouin ==
Alexis Gouin had known he was ill for some time and was determined to make testamentary arrangements to protect his daughter. But under French law at the time "the question arose as to whether a deaf-mute had the right to dispose of his property, to make a donation or a will", with some legal advisors still advocating "the obligation of articulated speech" as being essential to allow an individual to legally make their wishes known. After several refusals from Paris notaries, Alexis Gouin made his case with notary Jean-Baptiste Martin Moreau, mayor of the 7th arrondissement and member of parliament for Paris, and was able to draw up his will. On 25 February 1855, Alexis Gouin died at home. Three days later, his holographic will, drawn up in June 1850, was officially deposited with the notary in charge of the estate.

After Alexis Gouin's death, the Braquehais couple took over his studio in rue Louis-le-Grand, with Laure Mathilde continuing to colour daguerreotypes, now signed by her husband. Marie Gouin remarried the following year to the painter Frédéric Peyson, a friend of her late husband and son-in-law. He was also deaf. When Marie Gouin drew up the marriage contract, she took care to specify that "she had ceased to manage the photographic establishment that she operated with the late Mr Gouin and that she had no pecuniary interest in the said establishment". At the same time and until her death, she marketed, boxes of paint under the name ‘Couleurs Gouin’ containing "12 assorted tubes, 1 gold cup, 1 silver cup, 6 brushes". Marie Peyson died in 1858.

== Under the shadow of Bruno Braquehais ==
At the end of the 1850s, Laure Mathilde Braquehais's talent as a painter was occasionally praised in the press, particularly by Ernest Lacan, who praised the beauty of the painted stereoscopic portraits she now coloured, in addition to the daguerreotypes. In Le Moniteur de la photographie magazine, the journalist reported several times on the progress she had made in her colourisation technique, by applying fine powders to albumen prints. In 1863, the Braquehais bought a photography business at 11 boulevard des Italiens, which became their new address.

In 1865, Bruno Braquehais won a prize at the Berlin Photographic Exhibition, as did Pierre-Auguste Despaquis, another Parisian photographer. Despaquis became his business partner shortly afterwards. Braquehais won a further award at the 1867 Exposition universelle de 1867. The catalogue praised his ‘speciality of colours applied to glass, plates and paper’, but overlooked the key role of Laure Mathilde Braquehais in creating the works.

== Madame M. Gouin, photographer ==
In December 1873, a few months after photographing the events of the Paris Commune - and becoming one of first photojournalists - Bruno Braquehais went bankrupt and was imprisoned for thirteen months in Mazas Prison for breach of trust. In October 1874, the couple officially separated. It was during this time, age nearly 45, that Laure Mathilde Braquehais set up her own ‘industrial photography’ business under the name Mme M. Gouin at 9, rue Sainte-Apolline, and from 1881, at 60, rue du Château-d'Eau. Her estranged husband died on 14 February 1875 at his country home in La Celle-Saint-Cloud, shortly after his release from prison.

In 1882, Gouin showed her work in the Union Centrale des Arts Décoratifs exhibition. She presented ‘side by side a partially coloured print and the same print in simple photography, both intended for teaching purposes’. The prize jury recorded that ‘it is by staying within this fair measure, as Mme Gouin does, that the coloured addition is useful’ and awarded her a bronze medal. The following year, Laure Mathilde Braquehais also went bankrupt, which ended her photography career.

Laure Matlide Gouin Braquehais died on 4 October 1916 at her home, 47 boulevard de l'Hôpital, Paris. On her death certificate, she was mistakenly recorded as ‘Louise Mathilde Gouin, veuve Broquehais’. She was buried in Ivry Cemetery of Ivry-sur-Seine, under the name Laure Gouin, veuve Broquelais [sic].

== Collections and Exhibitions ==
- 1878: Photographs collected by Département des estampes et de la photographie de la Bibliothèque nationale de France, Paris.
- 1882: exhibion at Union centrale des arts décoratifs, Paris.
