= Bruno Braquehais =

French photographer (1823–1875)

- Born: Auguste Bruno Braquehais; 28 January 1823; Dieppe, France
- Died: 13 February 1875 (aged 52); La Celle-Saint-Cloud, France
- Occupation: Photographer
- Notable work: Paris During the Commune (1871)
- Spouse: Laure Mathilde Gouin

Auguste Bruno Braquehais (28 January 1823 – 13 February 1875) was a French photographer active primarily in Paris in the mid-19th century, in partnership with his wife Laure Mathilde Gouin. His photographic work documenting the 1871 Paris Commune is considered an important early example of photojournalism. While largely forgotten in the years after his death, his work was rediscovered during preparations for the Commune's centennial in 1971, and his photographs have since been the exhibited at numerous museums, including the Musée d'Art et d'Histoire, the Musée d'Orsay, and the Carnavalet Museum.

== Life ==
Braquehais was born in Dieppe, Seine-Maritime in 1823. Deaf from a young age, he attended the Institut royal des sourds et muets (Royal Institute of the Deaf and Mute) in Paris. He worked as a lithographer in Caen until 1850, when he met photographer Alexis Gouin (c.1790s–1855), and moved to Paris to work in Gouin's studio. Gouin specialised in coloured daguerreotypes (they were coloured by his stepdaughter, Laure Mathilde Gouin) and stereoscopic plates.

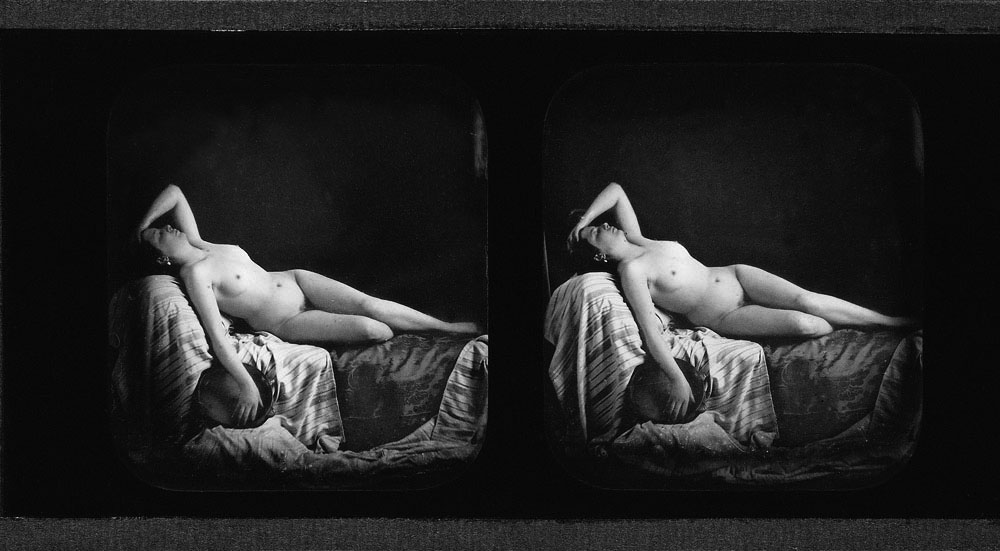
Stereoscopic plate of a reclining female nude, taken by Braquehais ca. 1856

In 1852, Braquehais opened his own studio on the rue de Richelieu in Paris, where he produced images of female nudes. Following the death of Gouin in 1855, he managed Gouin's studio with Gouin's widow, Marie, and stepdaughter (he married Gouin's stepdaughter, but sources are unclear whether it was before or after Gouin's death). In 1863, after the death of Gouin's widow, Braquehais opened a new studio, Paris Photography, on the Boulevard des Italiens. Braquehais's work was exhibited at the Société française de photographie in 1864 and at the Paris Universal Exposition of 1867.

In March 1871, a group of disenchanted soldiers, workers, and professionals seized control of Paris and set up a government known as the Paris Commune. This was one of the first major events in France to be "covered" by photographers. While many of these photographers focused on the ruins and destruction in the aftermath of the fall of the Commune, Braquehais ventured out of his studio at the height of the Commune's power, photographing its participants and events, most notably the toppling of the Vendôme Column. Braquehais published 109 of his photographs in a booklet, Paris During the Commune. After the fall of the Commune, government authorities used Braquehais's photos to track down and arrest the Commune's supporters.

In the years after the Paris Commune, Braquehais struggled financially, though he did do photographic advertising work for a clock company. By early 1874, he was bankrupt and was jailed for 13 months for loss of confidence. He died in February 1875, a few days after his release.

== Works ==
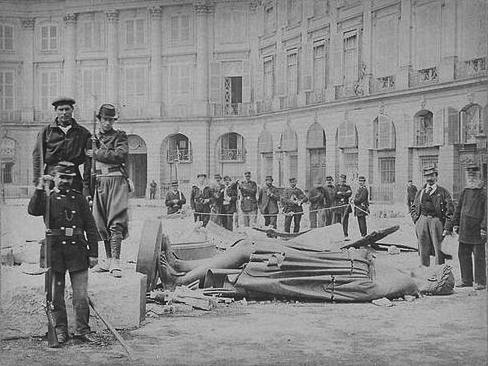
Communards pose with the toppled statue of Napoleon following the destruction of the Vendôme Column on 8 May 1871

Braquehais's early photographs consist primarily of portraits and female nudes, many of which were colored by his wife, Laure. Art critics have pointed out that many of Braquehais's photographs of female nudes are cluttered with distracting objects (e.g., the Venus de Milo), giving the model the appearance of being isolated. Notable portraits by Braquehais include composer Ludwig Minkus and choreographer Arthur Saint-Léon.

Braquehais's 109 photographs of the Paris Commune document the Commune at its height and after its fall. His photographs documenting the toppling of the Vendôme Column include scenes of the Column before its fall, a scene showing workers with ropes tied to the column ready to pull it down, and a photograph of Communards posing next to the toppled statue of Napoleon that had graced the top of the column. Braquehais also took numerous photographs of the various barricades the Communards had erected in anticipation of an invasion of republican forces, troops gathered at Tuileries Palace and Porte Maillot, and the ruins of the Maison Thiers.

Braquehais's photographs have been exhibited by the Musée d'Orsay, the Musée d'Art et d'Histoire at St. Denis, the Carnavalet Museum, and the Budapest Museum, and are included in the collections of the Metropolitan Museum of Art, the Bibliothèque Nationale, and the Bibliothèque historique de la ville de Paris.

== Gallery ==
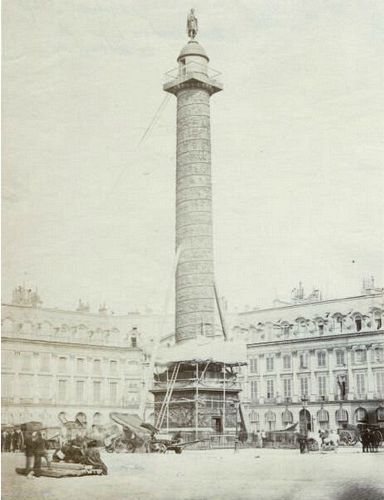
The Vendôme Column before the fall

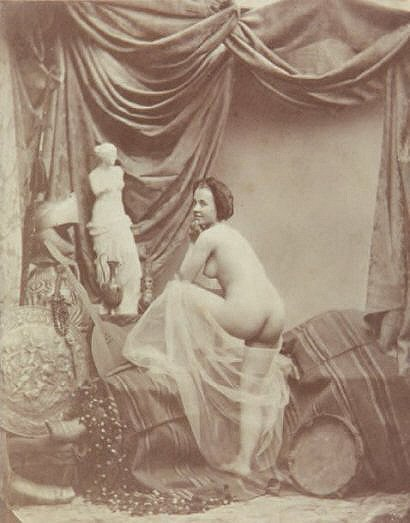
Nude Study with the Venus de Milo

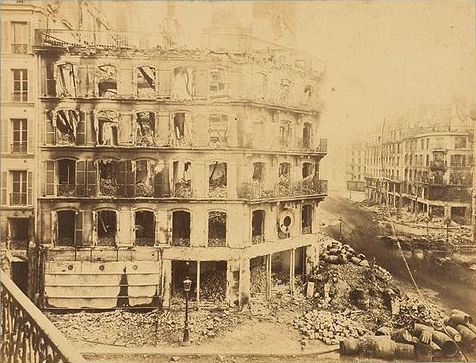
Ruins at the corner of St. Martin and Rivoli

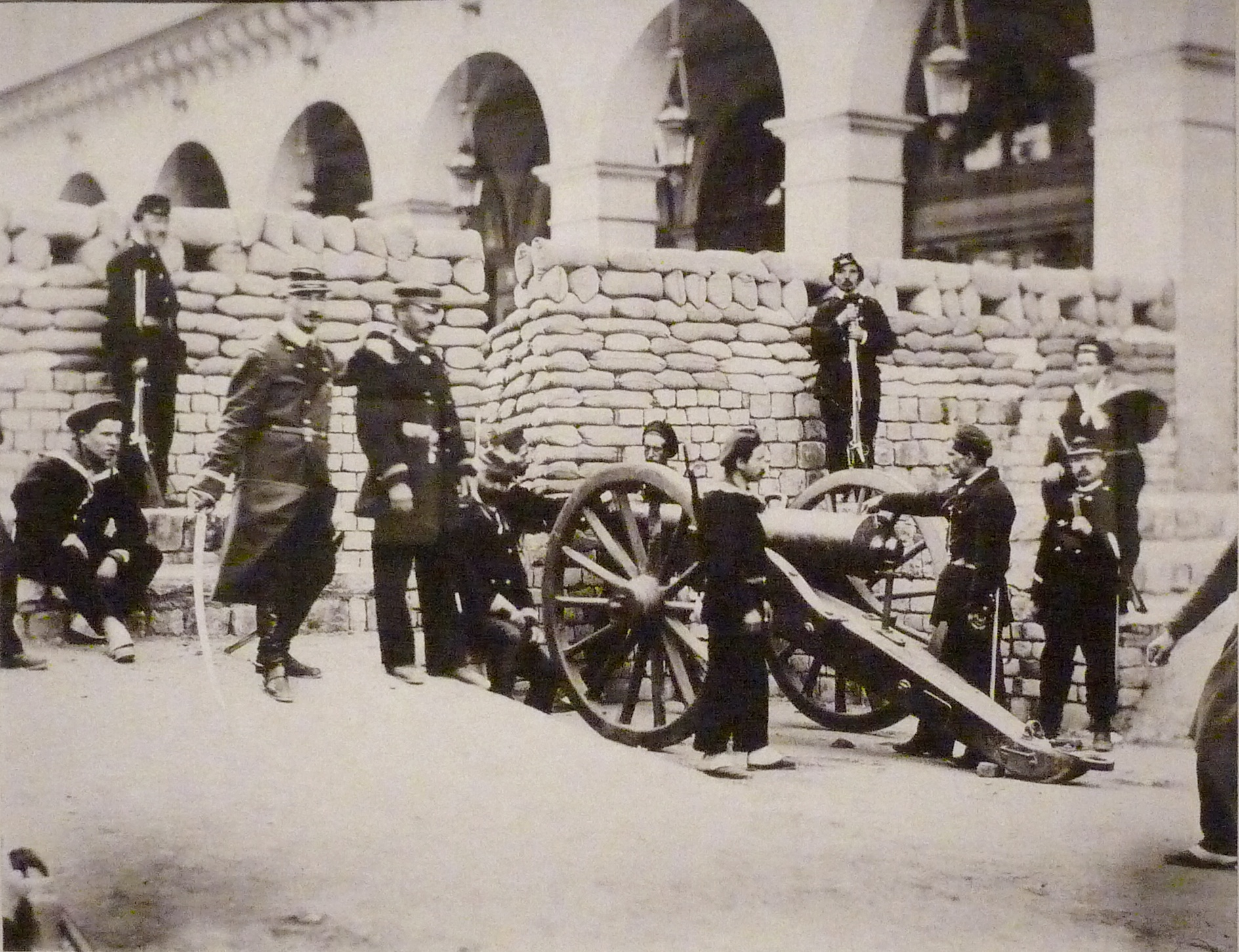
Paris Commune barricade
