= Château de Morlanne =

Restored castle in Morlanne in the Pyrénées-Atlantiques département of France

Coordinates: 43°30′36″N 0°32′8″W

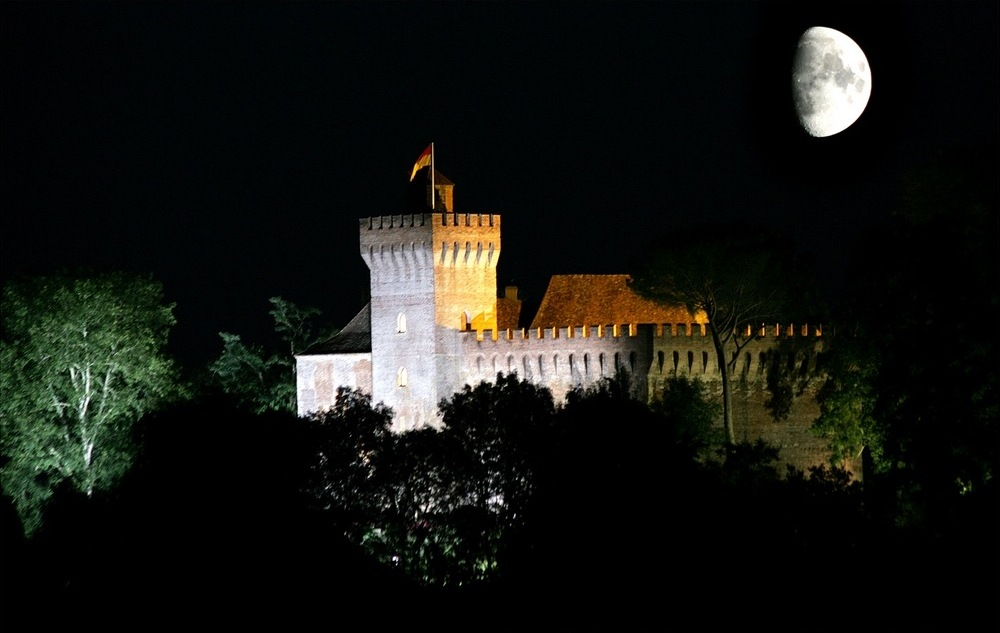
Night view of the castle.

The Château de Morlanne is a restored castle in the commune of Morlanne in the Pyrénées-Atlantiques département of France.

This imposing brick fortress, forming a polygonal enceinte, is a powerful 14th century structure with gateways, a courtyard, moats and a high keep. Inside is a manor house dating from the end of the 16th century.

The Château de Morlanne has been listed since 1975 as a monument historique by the French Ministry of Culture and is open to visitors.

== History ==
The castle, standing on a motte at the southern end of the village, was built about 1370 by the architect Sicard de Lordat for Arnaud-Guilhem, the brother of Gaston Fébus (Gaston III of Foix-Béarn), in order to supervise English Gascony. There had been an earlier building on the same site of which there is no description. In the second half of the 15th century, Odet d' Aydie (1425–1498), right-hand man of Charles VII and later of Louis XI, become lord of Morlanne and transformed the austere castle with more chimneys and windows. Further alterations between the 16th century and the 19th century transformed the building over time into pleasurable residence.

In 1866, the castle became the property of Albert de Domec, a member of one of the oldest families in Morlanne which had owned the lay abbey for centuries. Various families owned the castle until the second World War when it became an uninhabited ruin.

In 1969, the historian Raymond Ritter (1894–1974) acquired the castle and decided to restore the building as a medieval fortress. Works included restoring the defences of the surrounding wall towards the west starting from the keep, filling in windows added in the 18th and 19th centuries in the part of the enclosing wall next to the keep, rebuilding of the upper half of the keep and some of the buildings that had disappeared from the south-west of the courtyard. In 1975, M. and Mme. Ritter left the castle as well as its collection of works of art and furniture to the département of Pyrénées-Atlantiques.

== Description ==
The castle is a heptagonal building with unequal angles and sides. The enceinte is constructed of bricks with pebbles arranged in places in the shape of fern leaves. The corners are constructed of large dressed stones; some stones have been re-used and have evidence of sculpture. The brick built keep is constructed on a square plan and was formerly reached by a drawbridge. A second entry in the south-west is equipped with an identical doorway. It would seem that it was the main entrance. In the courtyard, the main building, again of bricks, has two square storeys. There is also a contemporary building equipped with a lean-to with curved tiles and plastered walls.

== Interior ==
The most harmonious furniture collections are on the first floor. A bedroom from the time of the Consulate and Empire has two mahogany beds. The Louis XVI room is hung with silks decorated with gold buttons. The library, where a secretary carved the inscription "Le Roi - La Nation - La Loi" ("The King - The Nation - The Law"), evokes the period of the Constitutional Monarchy (1791). On the second floor are the Louis XVI bedroom and a gallery of modern paintings.

Among the paintings on display are a view of Venice by Canaletto, a painting of the face of an old man by Fragonard, The Reader by Colson, The Happy Family by Lépicié and Visit to the Wet Nurse by Boilly. Other artists represented include Pannini, Snyders and Roslin. An entire room is devoted to the works of the expressionist René Morère (1907–1942), a friend of the Ritters.

== See also ==
- List of castles in France
