= Château de Mauvezin =

French castle in Hautes-Pyrénées

Coordinates: 43°07′07″N 0°16′35″E

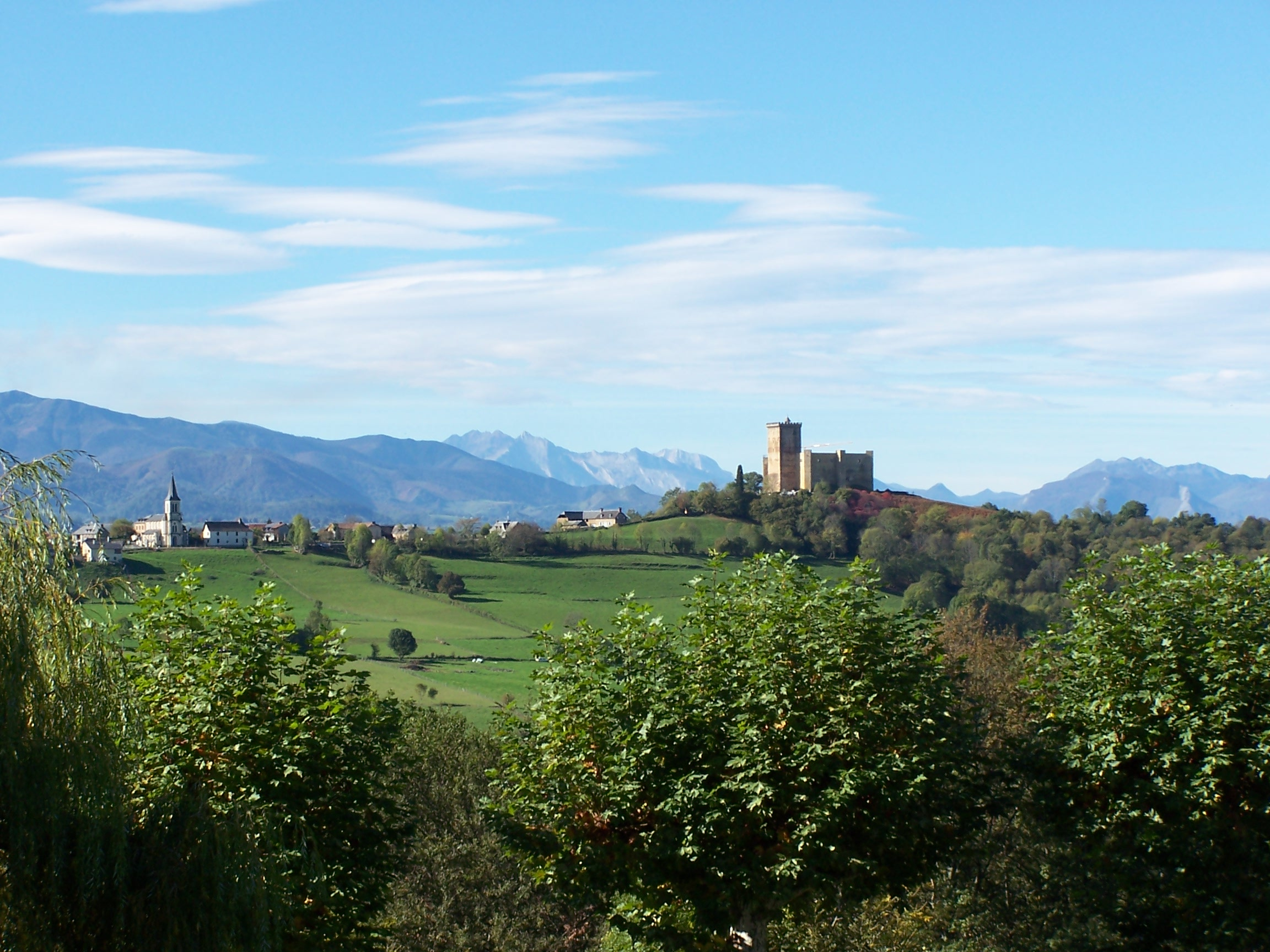
Château de Mauvezin (right)

The Château de Mauvezin (also known as Château de Gaston Phoebus) is a restored castle in the commune of Mauvezin in the Hautes-Pyrénées département of France.

== History ==
The site, occupied since protohistory, was transformed into a castrum in the Middle Ages and later into a castle.

In 1373, the King of France, Charles V, sent his brother, Louis I the Duke of Anjou, to besiege the castle and take it from the English. After six weeks, the English surrendered, the water having run out. The king gave the castle to the Count of Armagnac who saw it disputed by Gaston Fébus, the Prince of Foix and Béarn. The latter acquired it through his marriage to the Counts daughter, Béatrix. Gaston Fébus restored the castle (there is a museum dedicated to him on site) around 1380. With the accession of Henri IV and the merging of Bigorre into the Kingdom of France in 1607, it became crown property, fell into disuse and was dismantled piece by piece, its stones being used for local buildings. In 1862, M. Jubinal, député of Hautes-Pyrénées, bought the castle intending to create a historical museum there, but died before achieving his aim. In 1906, M. Ribal, mayor of Masseube, bought and restored it and created a Gascon museum.

It has been listed since 1941 as a monument historique by the French Ministry of Culture.

== Description ==
The inner courtyard within the rectangular enceinte is an example of medieval military architecture. Attached to the enceinte, the crenellated keep, with its round walk, today houses exhibitions. In the corners of the enceinte, projecting buttresses supported structures now disappeared. An arched construction in the middle of the courtyard could have been used as a cistern. The keep is constructed on a flat base of pebble concrete interspersed with lines of bricks, in a typical Gallo-Roman style. Above the main door are the arms of Gaston Fébus.

== See also ==
- List of castles in France
