= Alix Marie =

French artist

Alix Marie (born 1989) is a French artist who works with photography and sculpture, based in London. In 2019 she received the Royal Photographic Society's Vic Odden Award.

== Life and work ==
Marie was born in Paris. She studied for a Bachelor of Fine Arts at Central Saint Martins, London from 2008 to 2011 and a Master of Fine Arts Photography at the Royal College of Art, London from 2012 to 2014.

She was a two-week long Speed Resident at the Victoria and Albert Museum, London in 2014.

== Publications ==
=== Publications by Marie ===
- Bleu. UK: Môrel, 2017. ISBN 978-1-907071-60-7. Edition of 300 copies.

=== Publications with contributions by Marie ===
- Science and Fiction. London: Black Dog, 2014. RCA photography collective.
- MDAM. Joint publication with Mia Dudek. UK: Plantation Journal, 2017.
- Unique: Making Photographs in the Age of Ubiquity. Katherine Oktober Matthews. Netherlands: House of Oktober, 2018. ISBN 978-94-93075-01-6.
- BodyFiction. Austria: European Month of Photography, 2019.
- Body. Nathalie Herschdorfer. London: Thames & Hudson, 2019.
- Photography Now: Fifty Pioneers Defining Photography for the Twenty-First Century. By Charlotte Jansen. London: Tate; Octopus, 2021. ISBN 978-1-78157-620-5.

== Exhibitions ==
- Styx, National Center for Photography, Ballarat, 2021
- Sucer La Nuit, Musée Des Beaux Arts Le Locle, 2019
- Shredded, Roman Road, London, 2019

== Awards ==
- 2017: Winner, Portfolio Review Award, Duesseldorf Photo Weekend, Düsseldorf, Germany
- 2019: Vic Odden Award, Royal Photographic Society, Bristol
