= Sabine Pigalle =

French photographer and artist

Sabine Pigalle is a French photographer and artist. She was born in Rouen in France in 1963, and now lives and works in Paris. Pigalle studied at Sorbonne University and worked with Helmut Newton for four years focusing on fashion photography before moving on to more personal projects.

Most of her work concentrates on the reinterpretation of myths. Religious history, mythology, Flemish primitives painters and also mannerism provide both the varied sources of her inspiration and the raw materials for artistic explorations. Pigalle produces hybrid photographs in different series, mainly dedicated to the art of portraiture, that combine the contemporary with references to ancient art.

== Exhibits ==
Exhibitions held by Pigalle:

- 2002 Union of Decorative Arts, UCAD, Paris, France, « Motifs »
- 2002 Gallery Valérie Cueto, Paris, France, « Mue couture »
- 2003 Gallery Basia Embiricos, Paris, France, « H2O »
- 2004 Gallery Basia Embiricos, Paris, France, « Ducks »
- 2006 Gallery Celine Omotesando, Tokyo, Japan « Paris-Tokyo »
- 2007 Louise Alexander Gallery, Porto Cervo, Italy, Opening
- 2007 Comité Colbert, Hong Kong, « Devot-Ration »
- 2007 Centre Culturel ARAGON, Oyonnax, France, « A d'autres faims »
- 2007 Gallery Basia Embiricos, Paris, France, « Corps à corps »
- 2007 Gallery Boyer Labarre, Genève, Switzerland, « Protectors »
- 2008 Gallery Brasília, Paris, « Geishas »
- 2008 Transphotographiques, Lille, France, Tri Postal, Eglise Saint Maurice
- 2008 Louise Alexander Gallery, Porto Cervo, "East-West a contemporary dialog"
- 2008 Gallery Cueto Project, New York City, USA, "Spleen-flowers of evil"
- 2009 Comité Colbert, Hong Kong, « Croquembouche mystère »
- 2009 Louise Alexander Gallery, Porto Cervo, Italy “Ecce homo”
- 2009 Conseil Général de la Sarthe, Prieuré de Vivoin “Le sixieme jour”
- 2009 Conseil Général de la Sarthe, Abbaye de l’Epau “Dog is in the hair”
- 2009 Maison Parisienne, Geneva, Switzerland “Osmose”
- 2009 Ambassade de France Tokyo, Japan “No man's land”
- 2010 Louise Alexander Gallery, Porto Cervo, Italy
- 2011 Solo show "Protectors" at Hotel de Ville Woluwe Saint Pierre, Brussels, Belgium
- 2011 Solo show "Protectors" at Gallery Brandt, Amsterdam, Netherlands
- 2012 Group show "Beautiful Penis" at Analix Forever c/o Galerie Nuke, Paris, France
- 2012 Solo show "Timequakes" at Louise Alexander Gallery, Porto Cervo, Italy
- 2014 Solo show "Timequakes" at Chanel Nexus Hall, Tokyo, Japan
- 2015 Solo show "In Memoriam" at Wild Project Gallery, Luxembourg

== Filmography ==
- 2008 « Souper fin » L'éclaireur, Paris, France,
- 2008 « Sweet art - Parcours Saint Germain », « Devot-Ration »
- 2009 « Souper fin » Salone del Mobile, Milan, Italy, Maison et Objets, Paris, France

== Bibliography ==
- 2007 Toxy-Food. Prix du Jury Ladurée, Editions Intervalles
- 2009 Festins libertins, Editions Intervalles
- 2010 Protectors, Editions Intervalles
