= Hippolyte Bayard =

Early French photographer

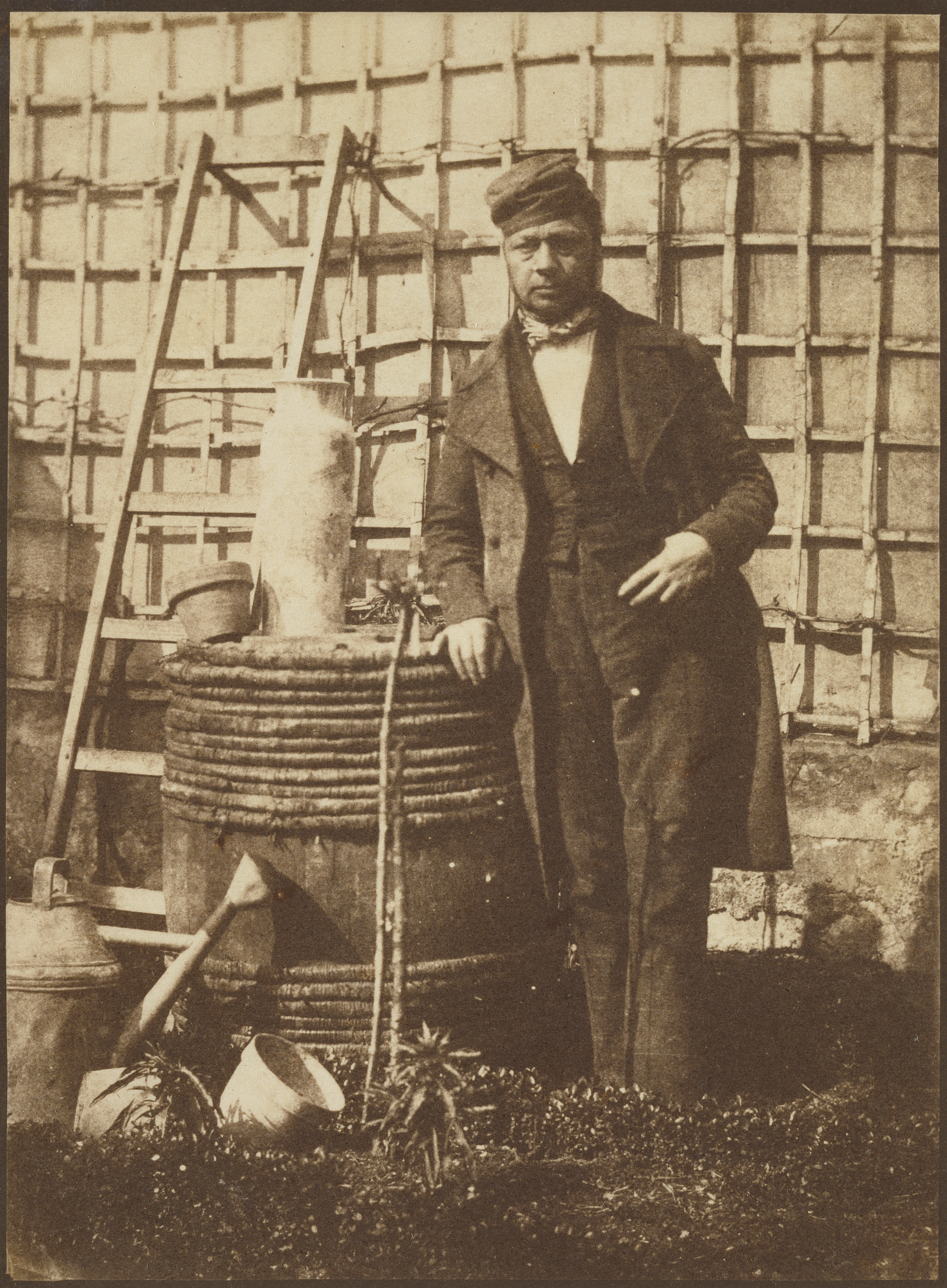
- Self portrait, salt print (1847)
- Born: 20 January 1801; Breteuil, Oise, France
- Died: 14 May 1887 (aged 86)
- Known for: Photography
- Notable work: Self Portrait as a Drowned Man

Hippolyte Bayard (French pronunciation: [ipɔlit bajaʁ]; 20 January 1801 – 14 May 1887) was a French photographer and pioneer in the history of photography. He invented his own process that produced direct positive paper prints in the camera and presented the world's first public exhibition of photographs on 24 June 1839. He claimed to have invented photography earlier than Louis-Jacques Mandé Daguerre in France and William Henry Fox Talbot in England, the men traditionally credited with its invention.

Bayard experimented with the new medium taking photos of plant specimens, statuary (including posing with them for self-portraits), street scenes, urban landscapes, architectural photos, and portraits. He photographed prominent figures and an ordinary worker. He also advocated combination printing and was one of the founders of a photo society.

== Early life and career ==
While working as a civil servant, Bayard experimented with photography beginning around 1838 according to his contemporary Eugène Durieu, but would personally claim to have begun work on his process "3 years ago" alongside his most famous image Self Portrait of a drowned man in October of 1840. He developed his own method of producing photos called the direct positive process, his first noted success occurring in March of 1839. It involved exposing silver chloride paper to light, which turned the paper completely black. It was then soaked in potassium iodide before being exposed in a camera. After the exposure, it was washed in a bath of sodium hyposulfate and dried.

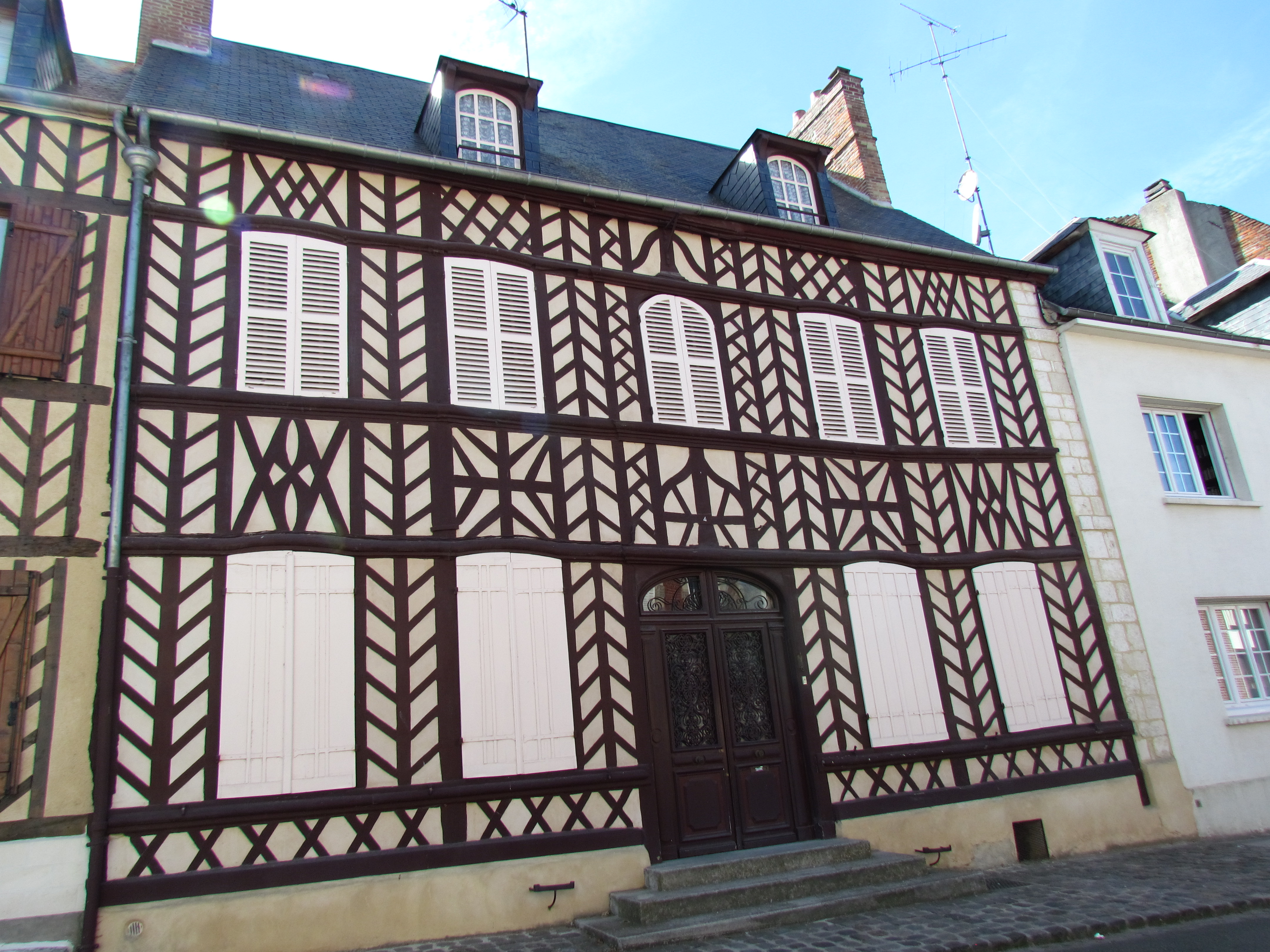
The home where Hippolyte Bayard was born (Maison d'Hippolyte Bayard) at 4 Bayard place in Breteuil

The resulting image was a unique photograph that could not be reproduced. Because of the paper's poor light sensitivity, an exposure of about twelve minutes was required, so that still-lives were favoured and human sitters were told to close their eyes to eliminate the eerie, "dead" quality produced by blinking and moving the eyes during a long exposure.

In the summer of 1851, along with photographers Édouard Baldus, Henri Le Secq, Gustave Le Gray, and O. Mestral, Bayard travelled throughout France to photograph architectural monuments at the request of the Commission des Monuments Historiques.

== Self Portrait as a Drowned Man ==
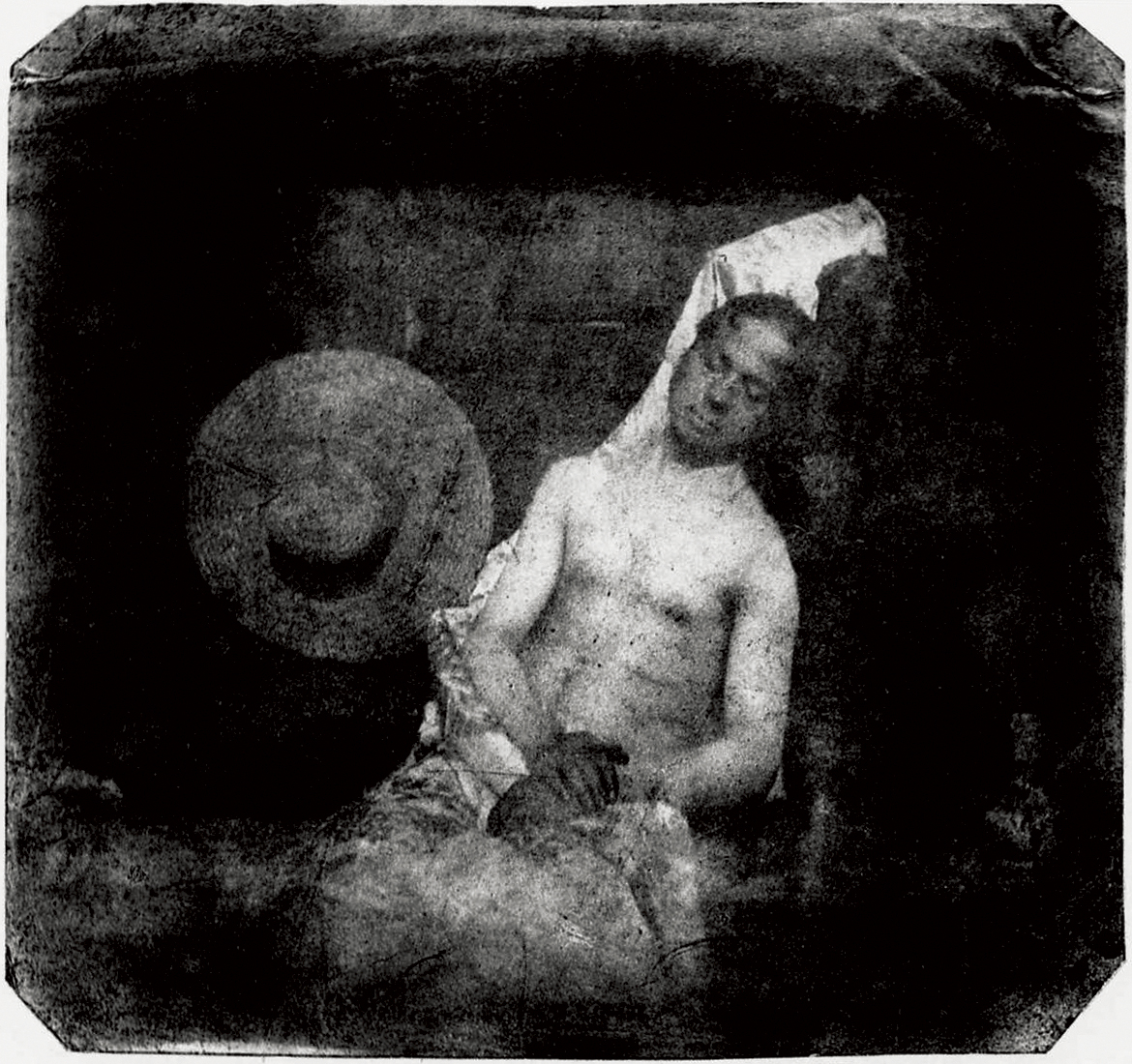
Self portrait as a drowned man, direct positive print

Bayard was persuaded to postpone announcing his process to the French Academy of Sciences by François Arago, a friend of Louis Daguerre, who invented the rival daguerreotype process. Arago's conflict of interest cost Bayard his recognition as one of the principal inventors of photography. He eventually gave details of the process to the French Academy of Sciences on 24 February 1840, in return for money to buy better equipment.

In reaction to the injustice that he felt he had been subjected to, Bayard made, on October 18th 1840, the first staged photograph, Self Portrait as a Drowned Man, in which he pretends to have committed suicide, sitting and leaning to the right. Bayard wrote on the back of his most notable photograph:

The corpse which you see here is that of M. Bayard, inventor of the process that has just been shown to you. As far as I know this indefatigable experimenter has been occupied for about 4 years with his discovery. The Government, which has been only too generous to Monsieur Daguerre, has said it can do nothing for Monsieur Bayard, and the poor wretch has drowned himself. Oh the vagaries of human life....! ... He has been at the morgue for several days, and no-one has recognized or claimed him. Ladies and gentlemen, you'd better pass along for fear of offending your sense of smell, for as you can observe, the face and hands of the gentleman are beginning to decay.

== Late career ==
Despite his initial hardships in photography, Bayard continued to be a productive member of the photographic society. He was a founding member of the French Society of Photography. Bayard was also one of the first photographers to be commissioned to document and preserve architecture and historical sites in France for the Missions Héliographiques in 1851 by the Historic Monument Commission. He used a paper photographic process similar to the one he developed to take pictures for the Commission. Additionally, he suggested combining two negatives to properly expose the sky and then the landscape or building, an idea known as combination printing which began being used in the 1850s.

== Famous photographs ==
Construction Worker in Paris, salt print (circa 1846)

- Self Portrait as a Drowned Man, 1840.
- Specimens, 1842.
- Construction Worker, Paris, 1845–1847.
- Self Portrait in the Garden, 1847.

== Gallery ==
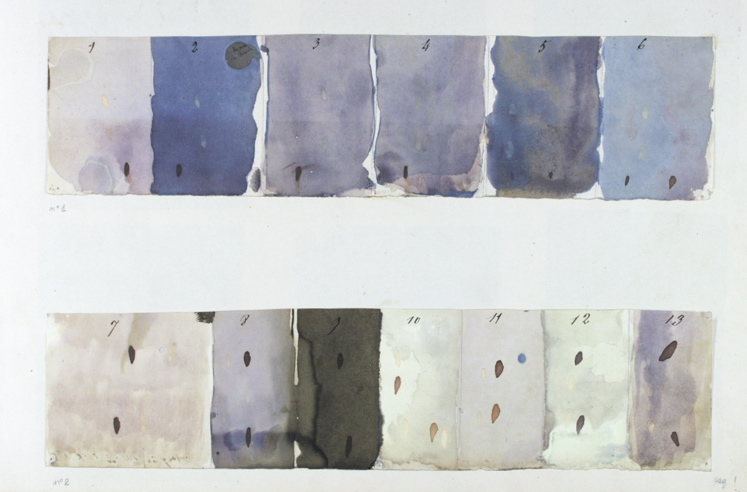
Tests of photosensitivity (1839)

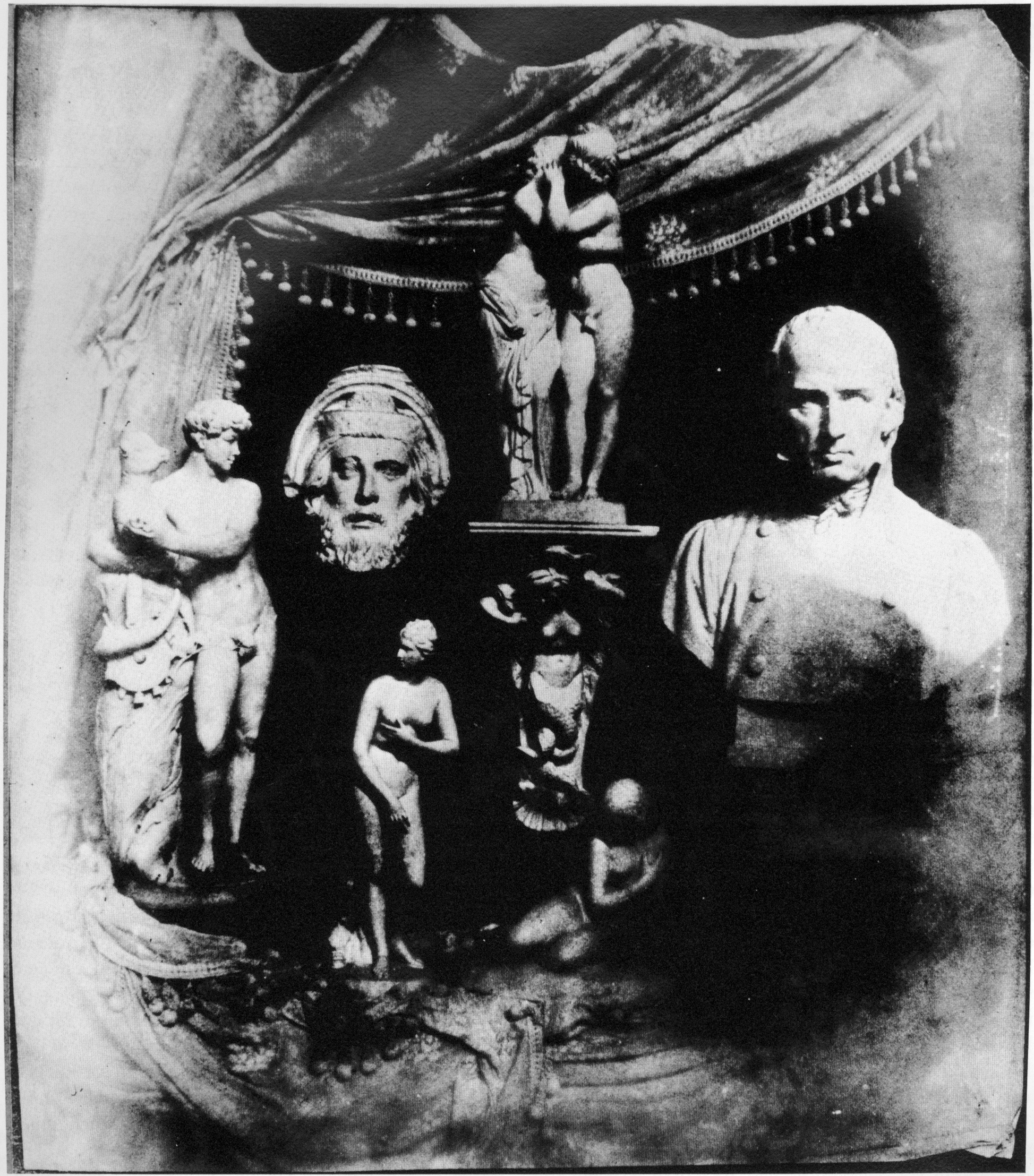
Still life with plaster casts circa 1839

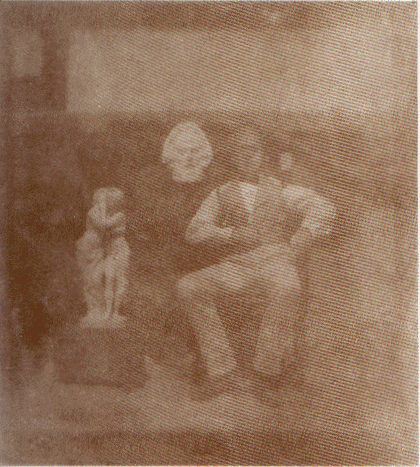
Self portrait (1839/1840)

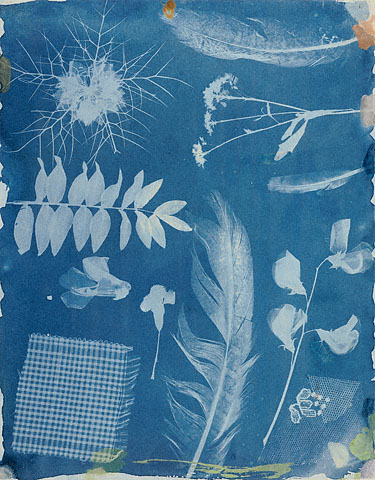
Arrangement of specimens, direct positive print (1842)

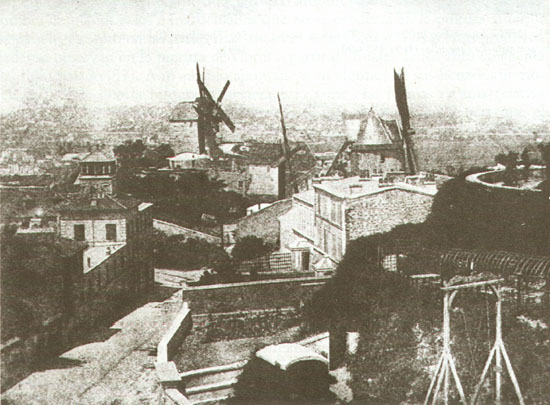
Montmartre circa 1842

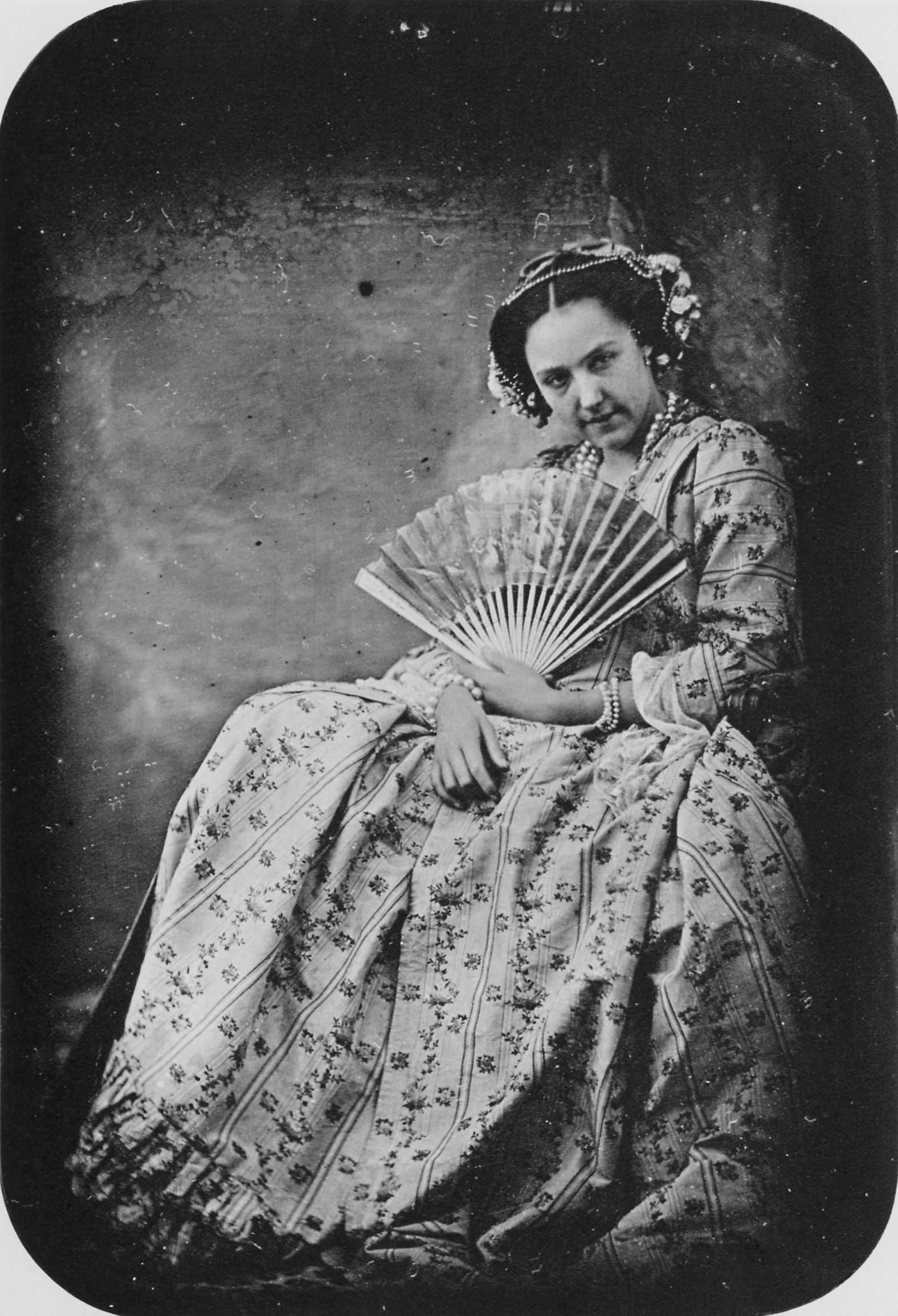
Woman with fan (1843)

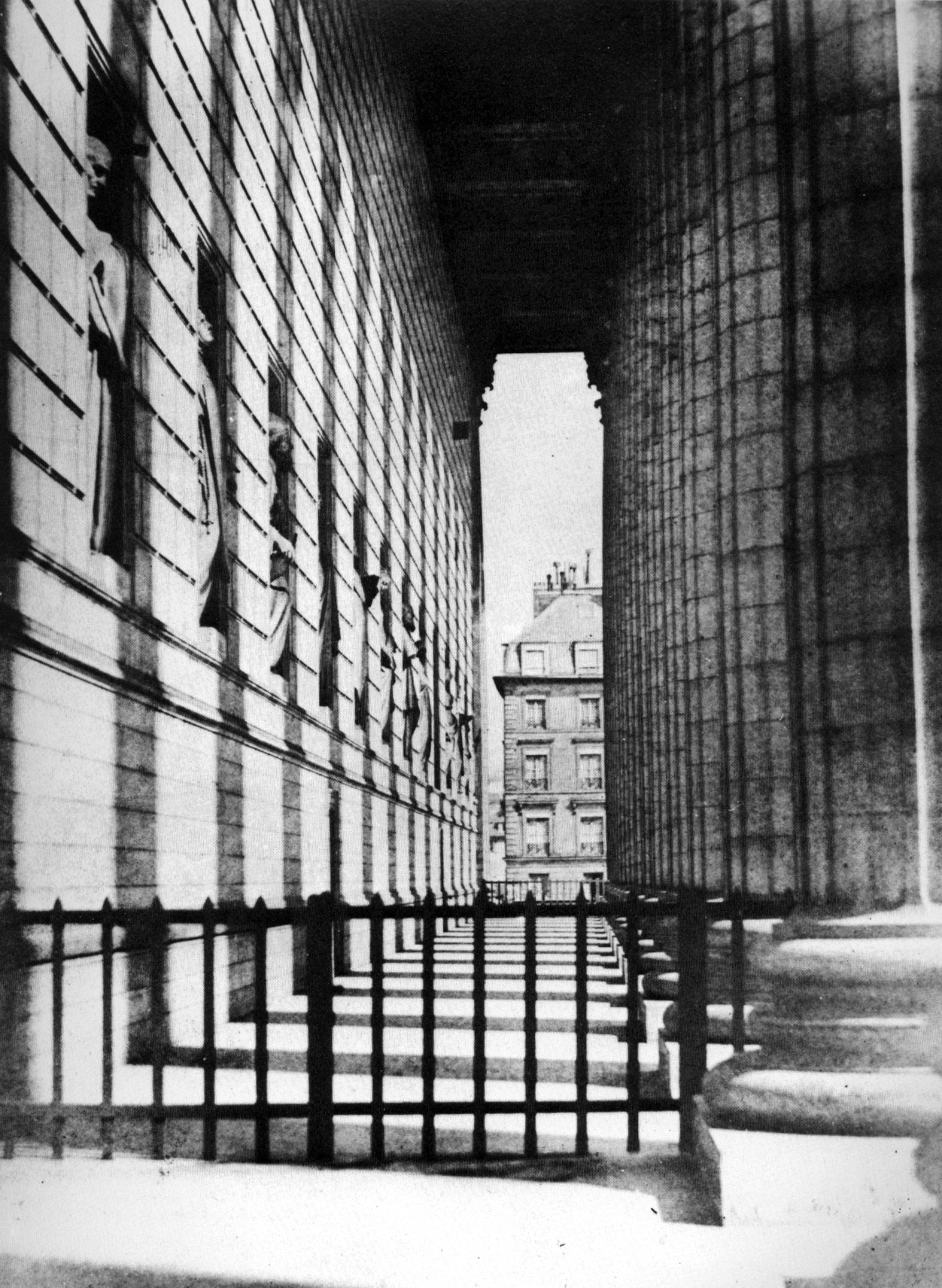
Madeleine Paris (circa 1845)

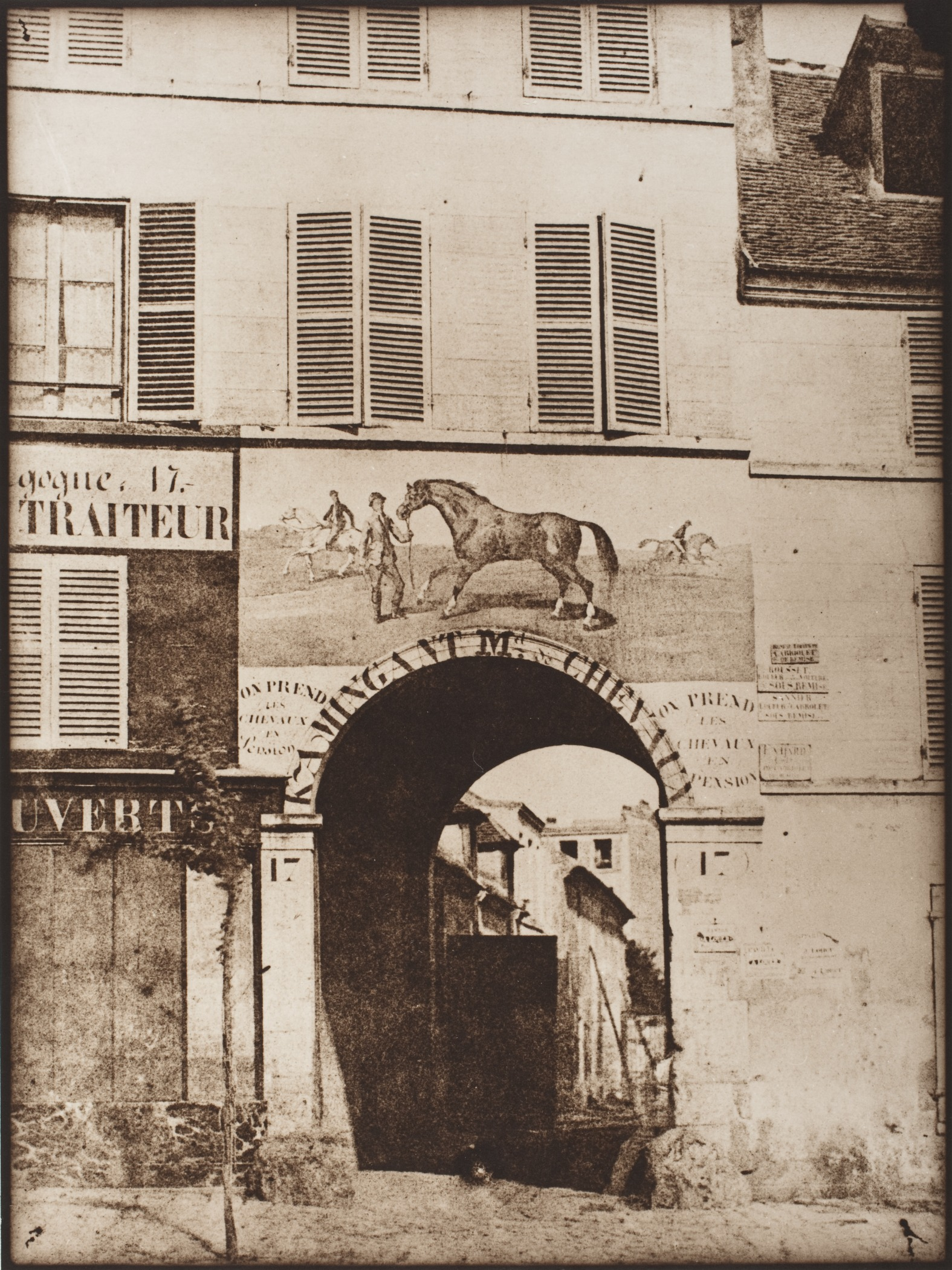
Arch and picture of horse (1847)

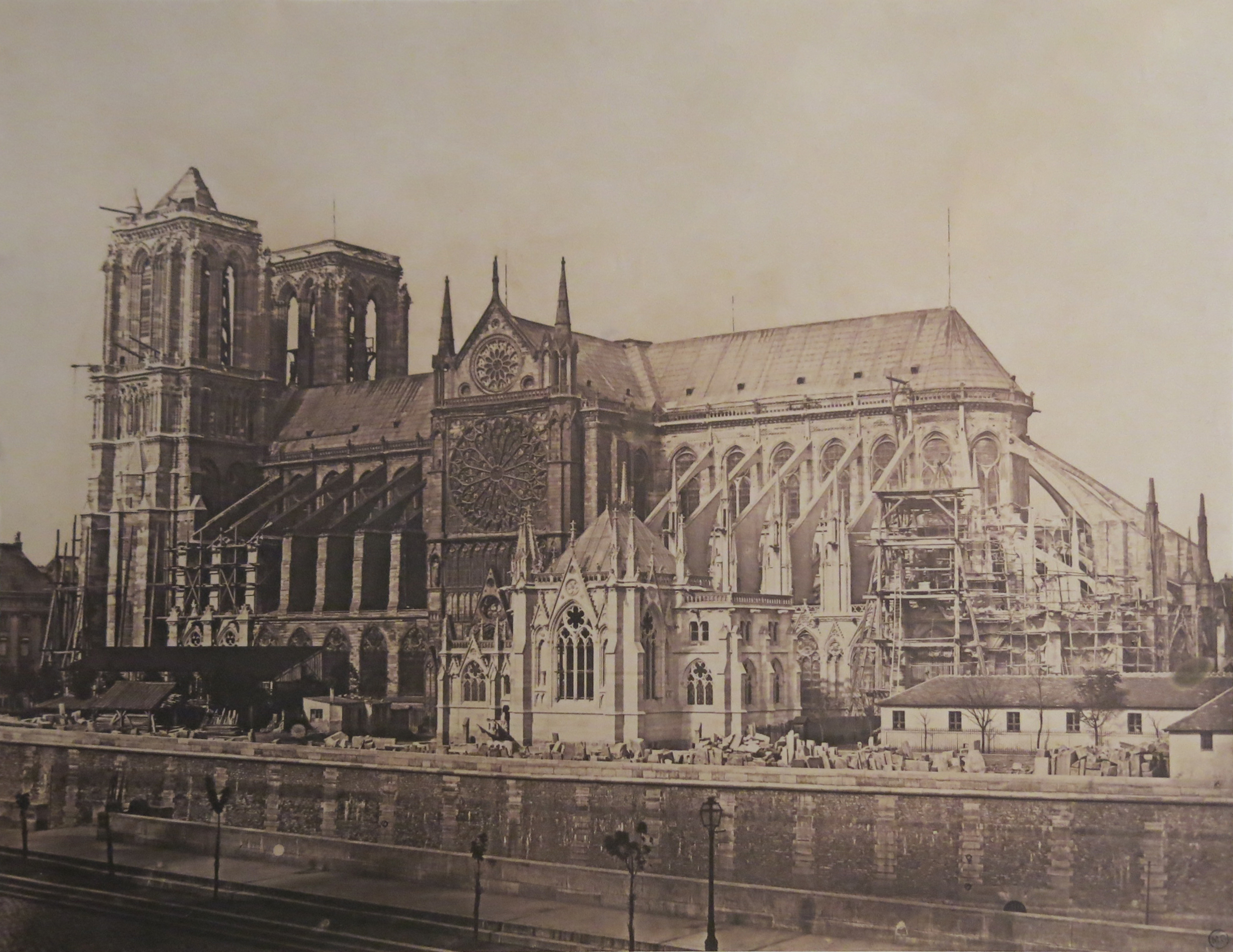
Cathedral of Notre Dame in Paris (1850)

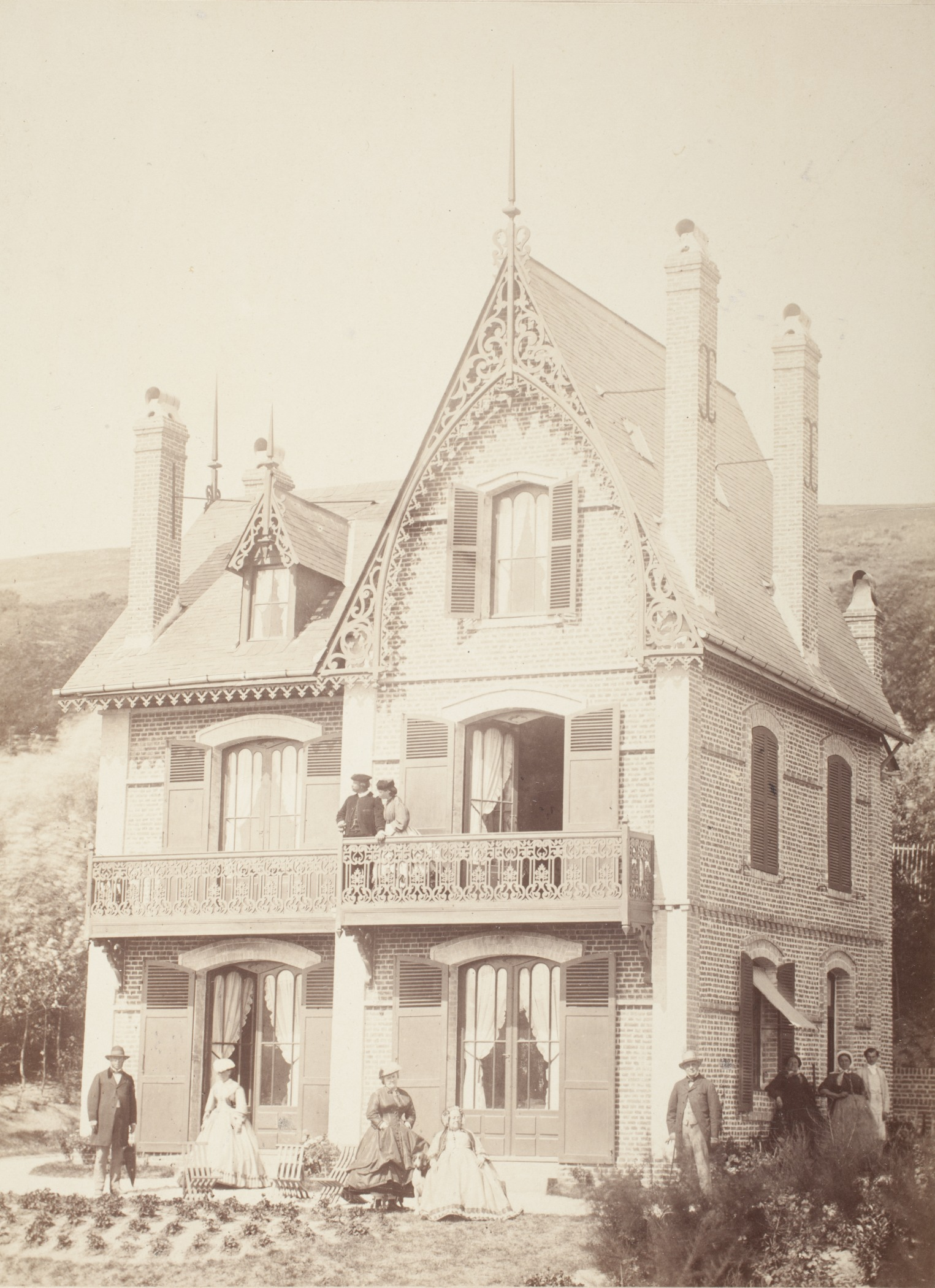
France, albumen print (1858)

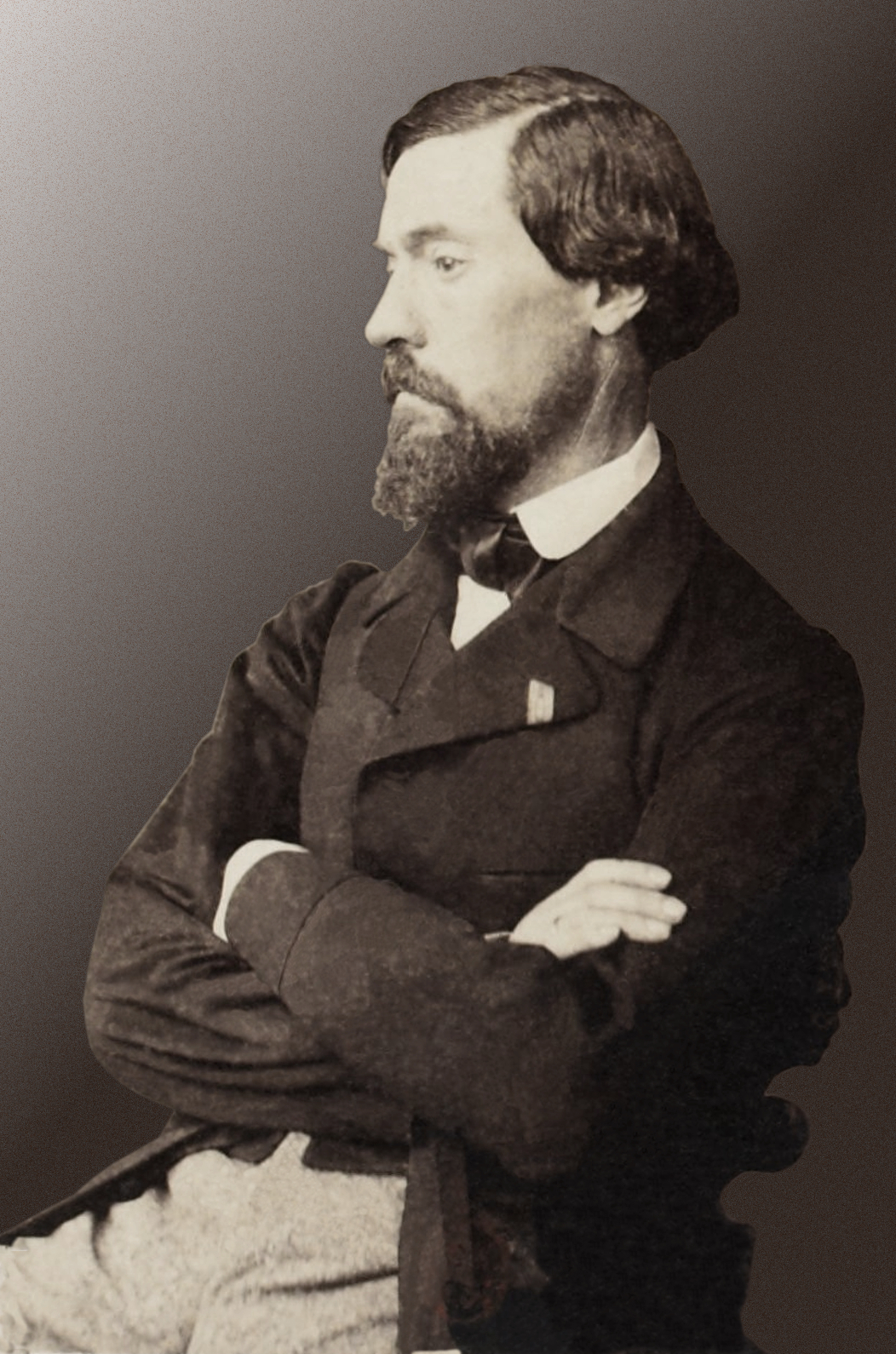
Pierre Michel François Chevalier (1861)

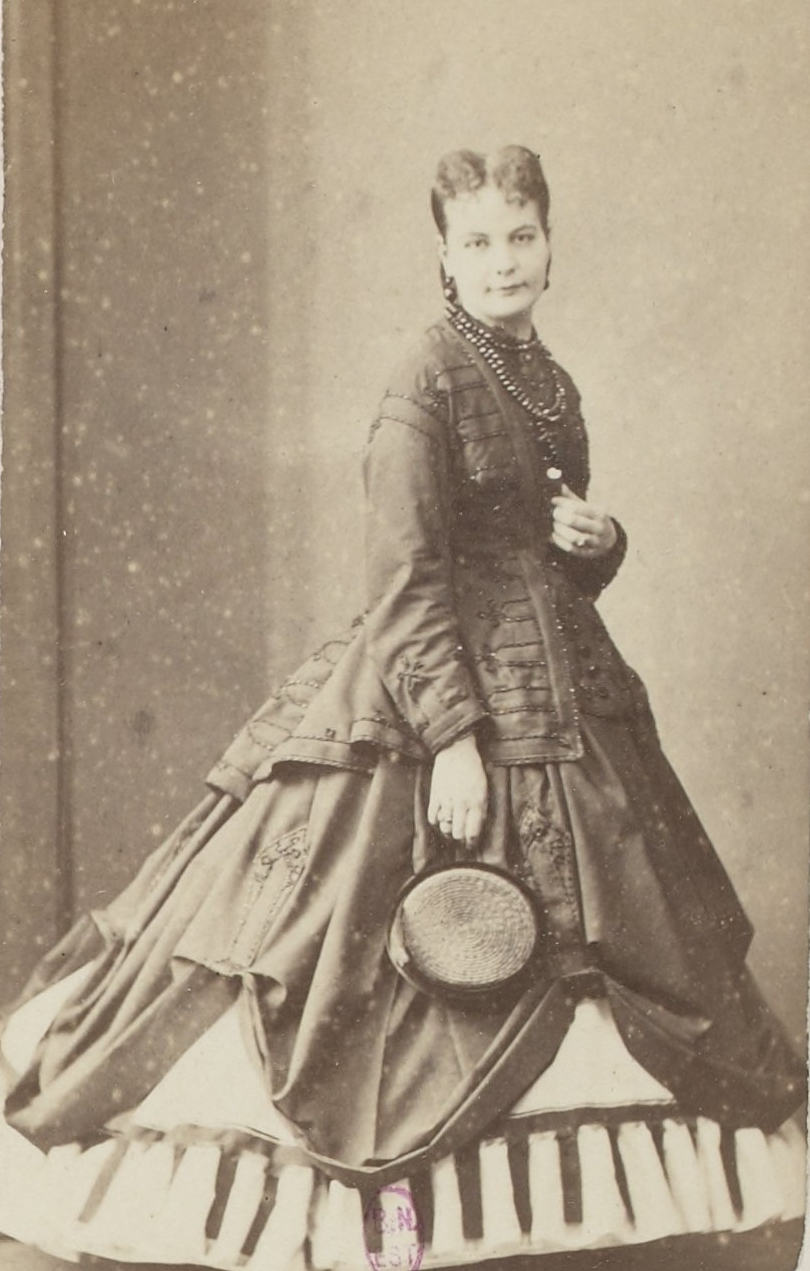
Duchess d'Harcourt

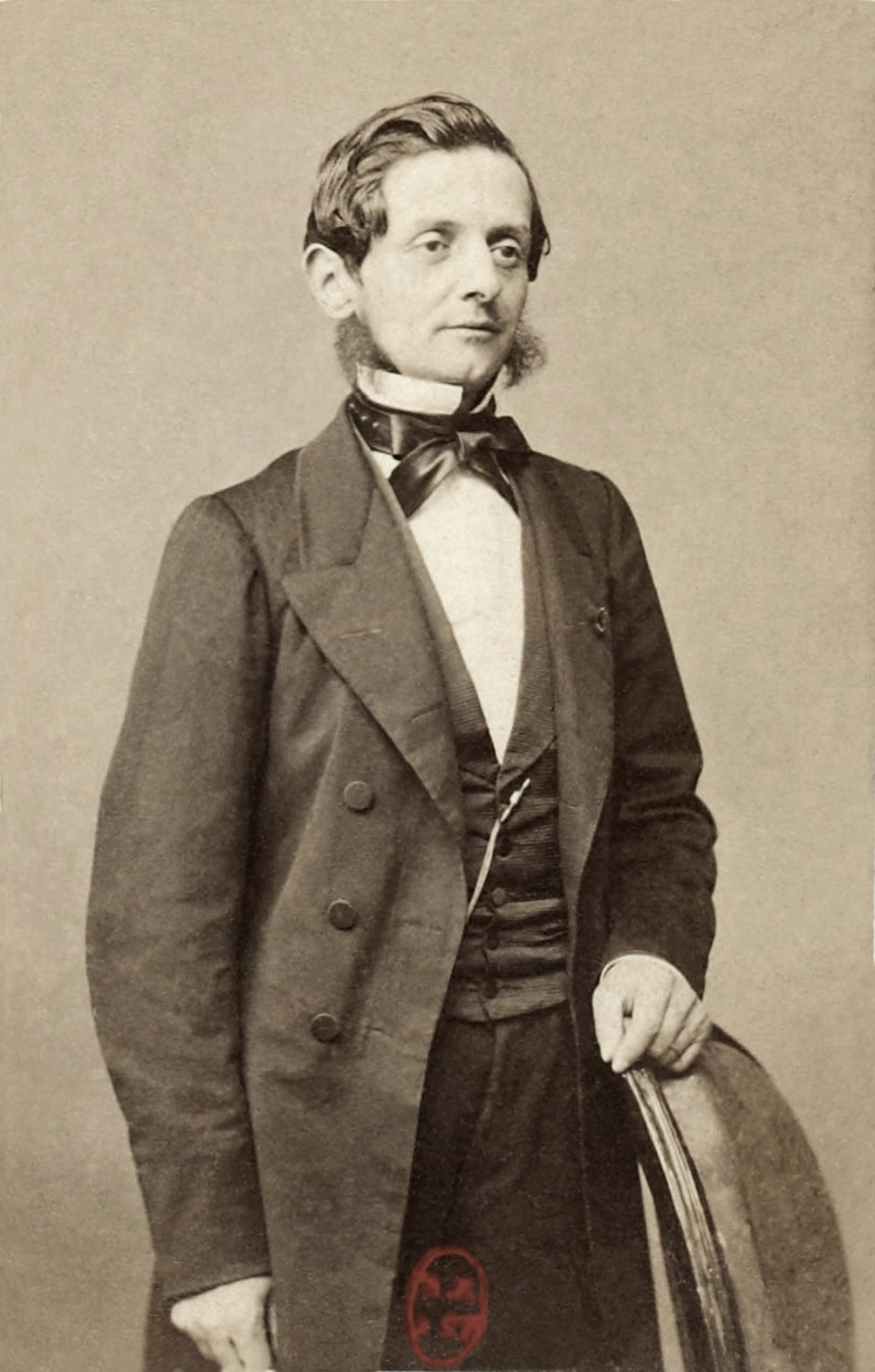
Ernest Pinard

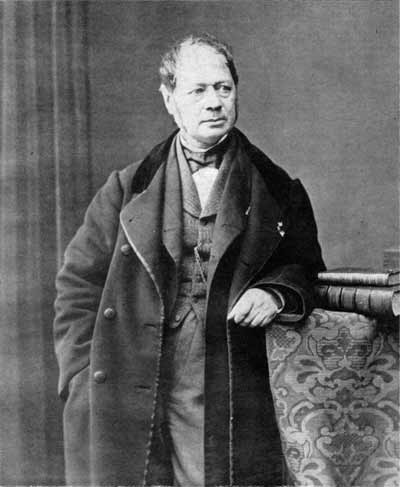
Self portrait (1863)

== See also ==
- Bayard Islands
