= Charles Nègre =

French photographer

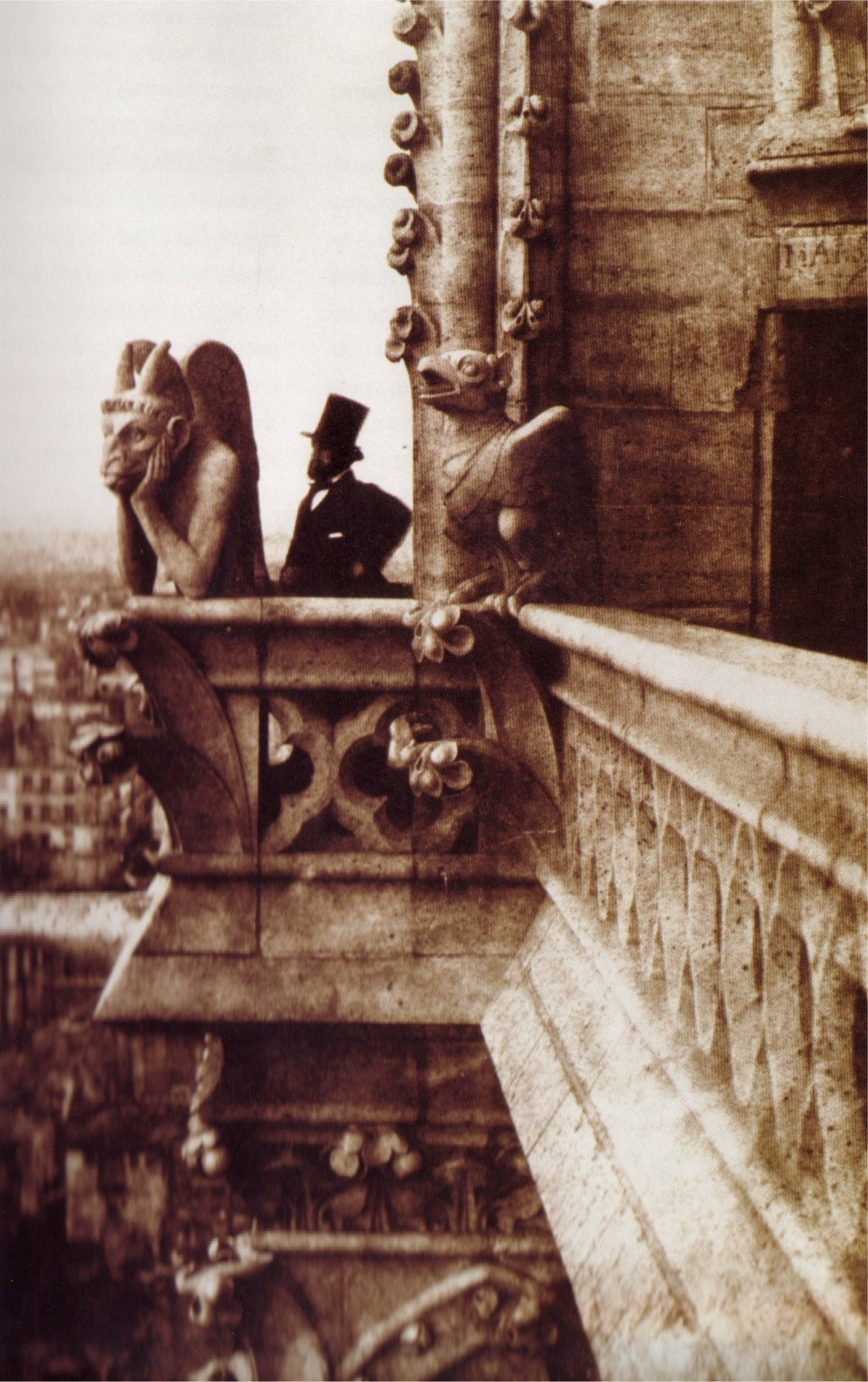
Henri Le Secq and "Le Stryge" on Notre Dame de Paris, photographed by Nègre in 1853

Charles Nègre (French: [nɛɡʁ]; 9 May 1820 – 16 January 1880) was a pioneering photographer, born in Grasse, France. He studied under the painters Paul Delaroche, Ingres and Drolling before establishing his own studio at 21 Quai Bourbon on the Île Saint-Louis, Paris.

Delaroche encouraged the use of photography as research for painting; Nègre started with the daguerreotype process before moving on to calotypes. His "Chimney-Sweeps Walking", an albumen print taken on the Quai Bourbon in 1851, may have been a staged study for a painting, but is nevertheless considered important to photographic history for its being an early instance of an interest in capturing movement and freezing it forever in one moment.

Having been passed over for the Missions Héliographiques which commissioned many of his peers, Nègre independently embarked on his own remarkably extensive study of the Midi region. The interesting shapes in his 1852 photograph of buildings in Grasse have caused it to be seen as a precursor to art photography. In 1859, he was commissioned by Empress Eugénie to photograph the newly established Imperial Asylum in the Bois de Vincennes, a hospital for disabled workingmen.

He used both albumen and salt print, and was known also as a skilled printer of photographs, using a gravure method of his own development. A plan commissioned by Napoleon III to print photographs of sculpture never came to fruition, and in 1861 Nègre retired to Nice, where he made views and portraits for holiday makers. He died in Grasse in 1880.

== See also ==
- Gustave Le Gray
- Henri Le Secq

== Sources ==
- "The Barrel Organ Player With Two Children Listening", Musée d'Orsay website, unsigned.
