= Studies in the History of Medieval Religion =

History book series

Studies in the History of Medieval Religion is a history book series published by Boydell & Brewer on the history of medieval religion. The series editor is Frances Andrews of St Andrews University. As of November 2016 there were 44 volumes in print in the series.

== See also ==
- Medieval World Series
- Routledge Studies in Medieval Religion and Culture
