= Carolyn Muessig =

Canadian Christian scholar and historian

Carolyn Anne Muessig holds the Chair of Christian Studies at the University of Calgary. A graduate of Fulton-Montgomery Community College, State University of New York at Buffalo, the University of Toronto, the Pontifical Institute of Mediaeval Studies, and the Université de Montréal, Muessig is a specialist in the history of medieval preaching, Jacques de Vitry, Francis of Assisi, Catherine of Siena and female educators of the Middle Ages. Prior to moving to Calgary, she was Professor of Medieval Studies at the University of Bristol. She was co-editor (with Veronica O'Mara) of Medieval Sermon Studies for 17 years and since 2001 she has been series co-editor with George Ferzoco of Routledge Studies in Medieval Religion and Culture.

== Selected publications ==
=== Books and edited volumes ===
- Medieval Monastic Preaching. Brill's Studies in Intellectual History, 90. Leiden, Boston, Köln: Brill, 1998. ISBN 9789004247444; ISSN 0920-8607.
- The Faces of Women in the Sermons of Jacques de Vitry. Peregrina Translation Series. Toronto: Peregrina, 1999. ISBN 9780920669594; ISBN 092066959X; ISSN 0832-7092.
- Preacher, Sermon and Audience in the Middle Ages. A New History of the Sermon, 3. Leiden and Boston: Brill, 2002. ISBN 9004114165; ISBN 9789004114166; ISSN 2590-230X.
- Medieval Monastic Education, edited with George Ferzoco. London and New York: Leicester University Press, 2000 ISBN 0718502469 hardback; ISBN 9781441143402 ISBN 1441143408 e-book; New York and London: Continuum, 2005 (Continuum Studies in Medieval History) ISBN 0826477666; ISBN 9780826477668.
- Envisaging Heaven in the Middle Ages, edited with Ad Putter. Routledge Studies in Medieval Religion and Culture, 6. London and New York: Routledge, 2007. ISBN 0415383838 (hardback); ISBN 020396621X (e-book); ISBN 9780415383837; ISBN 9780203966211
- A Companion to Catherine of Siena, edited with George Ferzoco and Beverly Mayne Kienzle. Brill's Companions to the Christian Tradition (ISSN 1871-6377) v. 32. Leiden and Boston: Brill, 2011. xvi, 395 p. : ill.; ISBN 9789004205550 (hardback); ISBN 9004205551 (hardback)
- The Stigmata in Medieval and Early Modern Europe. Oxford: Oxford University Press, 2020. ISBN 9780198795643

=== Articles and chapters ===
- 'Can't Take My Eyes Off Of You': Mutual Gazing Between the Divine and Humanity in Late Medieval Preaching', Optics, Ethics, and Art in the Thirteenth and Fourteenth Centuries, ed. by Herbert L. Kessler and Richard G. Newhauser (Toronto: Pontifical Institute of Mediaeval Studies, 2018 ISBN 9780888442093) 17–28
- 'Medieval Reportationes: Hearing and Listening to Sermons', L’Éloquence de la chair entre écriture et oralité, ed. by Gabriel Aubert, Cinthia Meli, and Amy Heneveld (Paris: Honoré Champion, 2018 (ISBN 9782745345202) 77–90.
