= Lindy Grant =

Lindy M. Grant FSA (born 1952) is professor emerita of medieval history at the University of Reading, an honorary research fellow of the Courtauld Institute of Art, and a former president of the British Archaeological Association. Grant is a specialist in Capetian France and its neighbours in the 11th to 13th centuries.

== Early life and education ==
Grant grew up in the Thames Valley area although her background is mainly Scottish. She read for her undergraduate degree (BA) in Medieval History at the University of St Andrews and then went onto the Courtauld Institute of Art where she studied for an MA in Medieval Art History and a PhD on ‘Gothic Architecture in Normandy in the Twelfth and Thirteenth Centuries’.

== Career ==
Following completion of her post graduate studies, Dr Grant remained at the Courtauld and worked for many years in the Conway Library as mediaeval curator. She recalls her time working with the collection:

"The collection included some wonderful early photographs, and I became very interested in the early history of photography, especially photography of monuments. The collection included photographs taken during Merimee’s famous ‘Missions Heliographique’ of 1851, to record the great buildings of medieval France, and photographs commissioned by Viollet-le-Duc to record his restorations of Notre Dame in Paris in the 1850s and 1860s."

Grant curated two exhibitions in the Courtauld Gallery in 1992 and 2004; the first featured photographs from the collections of T. E. Lawrence and his brother, A. W. Lawrence, including those of the photographer and travel writer Robert Byron. The second, early photographs of monuments in the Middle East, included works by James Robertson, Francis Frith, Wilhelm Hammerschmidt and Francis Bedford.

While at the Courtauld, Grant contributed many of her own photographs to the Conway Library whose archive, primarily of architectural images, is in the process of being digitised as part of the wider Courtauld Connects project.

In 2006 Grant was appointed professor of medieval history at the University of Reading, a post she held for 10 years before becoming professor emerita.

=== Media work and scholarship ===
During her career, Grant has appeared in a number of televised documentaries including two episodes of A Time Team Special on ‘Dover Castle’ (2009) and ‘The Secrets of Westminster Abbey’ in 2010. She was a guest of Melvyn Bragg in the In Our Time episode on BBC Radio 4 in 2016 when they discussed Eleanor of Aquitaine and her article on the medieval queen later appeared in the BBC History Magazine. She has published extensively and her work is often cited. Her biography of Abbot Suger, Abbot Suger of Saint-Denis: Church and State in Early Medieval France, ‘challenges scholarly conventions about the famous abbot. Grant suggests that Suger was not an original thinker, but rather a successful administrator and consummate politician whose theological views expressed a keen desire for orthodoxy’. A review of her most recent book Blanche of Castile, Queen of France heralded it as ‘an invaluable resource for studying Capetian France’.

== Public work and honours ==
Professor Grant has a long association with the British Archaeological Association, serving on its council, as Honorary Secretary from 1990 to 1994 and was elected president in 2010. She is now Lifetime Vice-president.

Grant was elected a fellow of the Society of Antiquaries of London on 1 January 1989. She is also a fellow of the Royal Historical Society.

As well as acting as an advisor to English Heritage on their conservation work of Dover Castle, Grant was on the Comité Scientifique for the Centre de compréhension de l’Europe du Moyen Age (Tapisserie de Bayeux) from 2012 to 2018 which, inter alia, discussed the possible loan of the Bayeux Tapestry to the United Kingdom. Grant is also involved with the Battle Conference for Anglo-Norman studies and is a Trustee of the British Academy Angevin Acta project.

== Selected publications ==
- Courtauld Institute Illustration Archives. Archive 1 Cathedrals & Monastic Buildings in the British Isles Part 11 Worcester, Harvey Miller, 1984
- Gothic architecture in Normandy, c.1150-c.1250, Department of the Environment, London, 1986.
- Abbot Suger of Saint-Denis: Church and State in Early Medieval France, Longman, London, 1998. (Medieval World Series) ISBN 0582051541
- Architecture and Society in Normandy, c.1120-c.1270, Yale University Press, 2005.
- "Blanche of Castile and Normandy" in Crouch, D. and Thompson, K. (eds.) Normandy and its neighbours, 900-1250 : essays for David Bates. Brepols, Turnhout, 2011, pp. 117–131. (Medieval texts and cultures of Northern Europe 14). ISBN 9782503520629
- Blanche of Castile: Queen of France, Yale University Press, 2016, ISBN 9780300219265
