= The Medieval Mediterranean (book series) =

The Medieval Mediterranean is a peer-reviewed history book series published by Brill on the medieval history of the Mediterranean area. The managing editor is Frances Andrews of St Andrews University. The series published approximately three books each year and had published 107 volumes as of November 2016.

== See also ==
- History of the Mediterranean region
- Medieval World Series
- Routledge Studies in Medieval Religion and Culture
