= Henri Le Secq =

French painter and photographer

Henri Le Secq des Tournelles
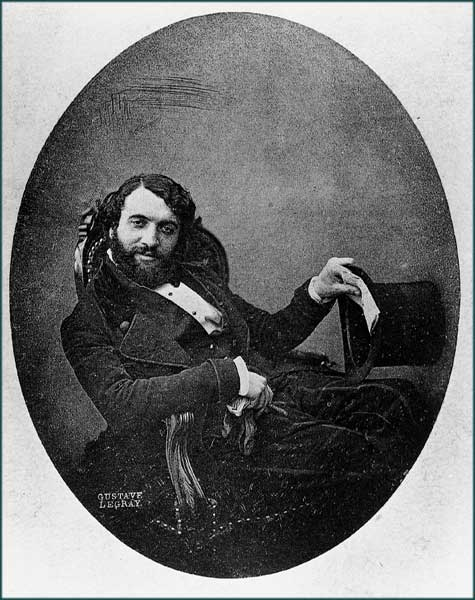
- Portrait of Henri Le Secq (1848) by Gustave Le Gray
- Born: 18 August 1818; Paris
- Died: 26 December 1882 (aged 64); Paris
- Occupations: Photographer, Painter, Sculptor, Collector

Jean-Louis-Henri Le Secq des Tournelles (18 August 1818 – 26 December 1882) was a French painter and photographer. After the French government made the daguerreotype open for public in 1839, Le Secq was one of the five photographers selected to carry out a photographic survey of architecture (Commission des Monuments Historiques).

== Early life ==
Jean-Louis-Henri Le Secq des Tournelles was born in 1818 in Paris, of an ancient noble family from Normandy. His father was a politician. Jean-Louis-Henri was trained in sculpture and worked in several studios. He was also a collector of wrought iron objects and the Musée le Secq des Tournelles in Rouen is devoted to him. He started his photographic career while still working as a painter in the studio of Paul Delaroche.

== Middle years ==
He experimented with various photograph processing techniques together with his colleague Charles Nègre and later worked with Gustave Le Gray learning the waxed-paper negative process. This process had the advantage that it produced negatives unlike the daguerreotype process. He, along with Hippolyte Bayard, Edouard Baldus, Gustave Le Gray and Auguste Mestral (O. Mestral), was sent on Missions Héliographiques to document famous architectural monuments in France. He worked mainly on cathedrals in Chartres, Strasbourg, Reims and near Paris. Cameras capable of taking large photographs, sized up to 51 cm by 74 cm, were used. His works during this Commission des Monuments Historiques are considered his finest. In 1851 he became one of the founders of the first photographic organization of the world, the Société héliographique (1851–1853), which was very short lived.

== Later years ==
Le Secq des Tournelles gave up photography after 1856 but continued to paint and collect art. Around 1870 he started reprinting his famous works as cyanotypes because he was afraid of possible loss due to fading. He gave the reprints the dates of the original negatives, some of which are still in good condition.

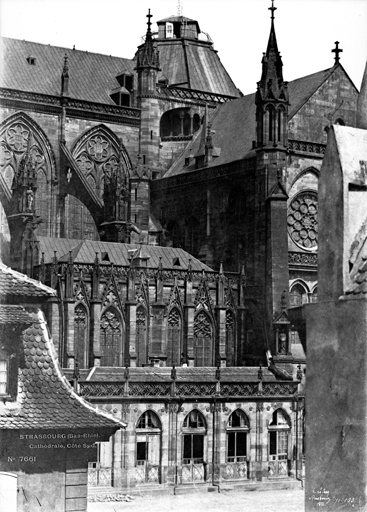
Strasbourg Cathedral

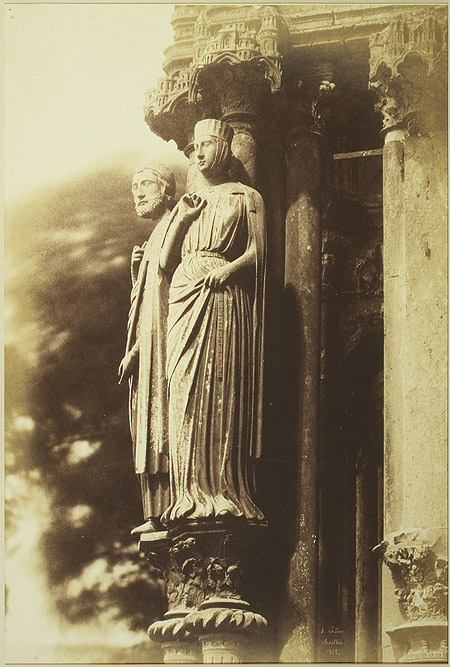
Large figures on the North porch, Chartres Cathedral

== See also ==
- Gustave Le Gray
- Société française de photographie
