= Veronica O'Mara =

British historian

Veronica O'Mara is a historian at the University of Leeds who is a specialist in medieval English religious literature, particularly sermons, and female literacy. She is joint editor with Carolyn Muessig of Medieval Sermon Studies. O'Mara is engaged in a long-term project on Nuns' Literacies in Medieval Europe which has resulted in conferences in Hull (2011), Missouri-Kansas City (2012), and Antwerp (2013).

== Selected publications ==
- A Study and Edition of Selected Middle English Sermons, Leeds Texts and Monographs, n.s. 13 (Leeds: School of English 1994)
- The Index of Middle English Prose: Handlist XIII, A Handlist of Manuscripts containing Middle English Prose in Lambeth Palace Library (with Dr O. S. Pickering) (Cambridge: Brewer, 1999)
- The Translation of the Works of St Birgitta of Sweden into the Medieval European Vernaculars (with Dr Bridget Morris), The Medieval Translator, 7 (Turnhout: Brepols, 2000) (Editor)
- Four Middle English Sermons Edited from British Library MS Harley 2268, Middle English Texts, 33 (Heidelberg: Winter, 2002)
- Literature, Readers and Dialogue: Essays by and in Reply to Douglas Jefferson (with Professor Janet Clare) (Dublin: University College Dublin Press: 2006) (Editor)
- A Repertorium of Middle English Prose Sermons (with Dr Suzanne Paul), Sermo, 1, 4 volumes (Turnhout: Brepols, 2007)
- Nuns’ Literacies in Medieval Europe: The Hull Dialogue (with Professor Virginia Blanton and Dr Patricia Stoop) (Turnhout: Brepols, 2013) (Editor)
- Preaching the Word in Manuscript and Print: Essays in Honour of Susan Powell (with Professor Martha W. Driver), Sermo, 11 (Turnhout: Brepols, 2013) (Editor)
