= Matthew Innes =

Professor of History at Birkbeck, University of London

Professor Matthew Innes
- Born: West Yorkshire
- Awards: Gladstone Book Prize

Academic background
- Education: University of Cambridge
- Doctoral advisor: Rosamond McKitterick

Matthew Innes is a British academic and university administrator who was previously Deputy Vice-Chancellor and Professor of History at Birkbeck, University of London.

== Academic career ==
Innes grew up in West Yorkshire and by "sheer brute luck" earned a place to read History at the University of Cambridge. He earned a double first in his BA in 1991 and went on to complete a PhD in 1996, supervised by Rosamond McKitterick.

Innes' first university appointment was to a Junior Research Fellowship at Peterhouse, Cambridge, in 1994. After subsequent spells at the University of Birmingham and the University of York, he joined Birkbeck, University of London as Lecturer in History in 1999. He was promoted to Senior Lecturer in 2002, Reader in 2004, and finally Professor in 2006.

Innes previously served as Head of the School of Historical Studies and Dean of the Faculty of Humanities and Social Sciences at Birkbeck. In 2008 he was appointed Pro-Vice-Master with responsibility for strategy, and served on the college's board of governors as an academic representative between 2005 and 2009. He was appointed Vice Master in June 2013. His title has since been changed to Deputy Vice-Chancellor with responsibility for academic and corporate affairs.

== Research ==
Innes' research interests are broadly located in the history of western Europe from the end of the Roman Empire to the eleventh century, with particular specialisms in economic, social and cultural history.

== Media work ==
Innes has appeared twice as an expert panelist on the BBC Radio 4 programme In Our Time: first in 2006 on the Carolingian Renaissance, and then in 2014 on the Battle of Tours.

== Honours and awards ==
- The Philip Leverhulme Prize for Outstanding Research (2004)
- The Royal Historical Society's Gladstone History Book Prize (2000) for State and society in the middle ages: the Middle Rhine Valley, 400-1000

== Personal life ==
Innes is married to Jayne.

== Selected publications ==
- 'Memory, orality and literacy in an early medieval society', Past & Present 158 (1998), pp. 3–36
- State and society in the early Middle Ages: the Middle Rhine Valley, 400-1000 (Cambridge: Cambridge University Press, 2000)
- The uses of the past in the early Middle Ages (Cambridge: Cambridge University Press, 2004) (co-edited with Yitzhak Hen)
- Introduction to early medieval Western Europe, 300-900: the sword, the plough and the book (London: Routledge, 2007)
- The Carolingian world (Cambridge: Cambridge University Press, 2011) (co-authored with Marios Costambeys and Simon MacLean)
- Documentary culture and the laity in the early Middle Ages (Cambridge: Cambridge University Press, 2013) (co-edited with Warren C. Brown, Marios Costambeys and Adam J. Kosto)
- 'Queenship in dispute: Fastrada, history and law', in Elina Screen and Charles West (eds.), Writing the early medieval West: essays in honour of Rosamond McKitterick (Cambridge: Cambridge University Press, 2018), pp. 230–247
