= Bayard Islands =

The Bayard Islands (64°56′S 63°14′W) are a small group of islands lying 1.6 km (1 mi) northeast of Cape Willems, off the west coast of Graham Land. They were charted by the Belgian Antarctic Expedition under Gerlache, 1897–99, and named by the UK Antarctic Place-Names Committee in 1960 for Hippolyte Bayard, a French civil servant who, in 1839, independently invented a photographic process for obtaining direct positives on paper.

== See also ==
- List of Antarctic and sub-Antarctic islands
- List of archipelagos
