= Warren C. Brown =

American historian

Warren C. Brown is a professor of history at the California Institute of Technology. His research relates to the social history of early medieval Europe, conflict resolution and social and institutional memory. He is the editor of the Medieval World Series, published by Routledge.

== Education ==
- 1985 B.M., French Horn Performance, New England Conservatory
- 1985 B.S., Physics, Tufts University
- 1993 M.A., History, University of Cincinnati
- 1997 Ph.D., Medieval History, University of California, Los Angeles

== Selected publications ==
- Unjust Seizure: Conflict, Interest, and Authority in an Early Medieval Society, Cornell University Press, 2001.
- Conflict in Medieval Europe: Changing Perspectives on Society and Culture, Ashgate Publishing, 2003 (with Piotr Górecki).
- Violence in Medieval Europe, Routledge, 2011.
- Documentary Culture and the Laity in the Early Middle Ages, Cambridge University Press, Cambridge, 2013 (with Marios Costambeys, Matthew Innes and Adam J. Kosto).
