= Frances Andrews =

British historian

Frances Andrews FRHistS
- Born: 1961 (age 64–65)
- Other name: Frances Elizabeth Andrews

Academic background
- Education: University of London
- Thesis: The Early Humiliati (1994)

Academic work
- Discipline: History
- Sub-discipline: Medieval Christian history; medieval Italian history
- Institutions: University of St Andrews

Frances Elizabeth Andrews FRHistS is a British historian who is professor of medieval history at the University of St Andrews, Scotland. She is a specialist in the medieval church and its networks.

== Life ==
Andrews is the managing editor of Brill's Medieval Mediterranean series and also the series editor for Boydell and Brewer's Studies in the History of Medieval Religion. She was President of the Ecclesiastical History Society (2014–2015).

Her research interests fall into two main areas: medieval Italy and medieval Christianity, with a particular focus on relations between religion and public life, the history of the friars, the Humiliati, and urban history. She is currently writing a monograph on the employment of religious in government and administration.

Beginning in 2019, she led a small team of historians under the aegis of the Royal Historical Society in a new investigation into the experience of LGBT+ historians and on the teaching of LGBT+ histories in UK universities. She coordinates the 'Women Historians of St Andrews' project, which aims to seek out the women who studied, researched and taught history at St Andrews, at any point in time.

== Selected publications ==
- The Early Humiliati. 1999.
- The Other Friars. 2006.
- Doubting Christianity: The Church and Doubt. 2016. (co-edited with Charlotte Methuen and Andrew Spicer)

== Publications ==
- Como and Padua: Andrews, F. E., 22 Aug 2018, Italy and Early Medieval Europe. Papers for Chris Wickham. Balzaretti, R., Barrow, J. & Skinner, P. (eds.). Oxford University Press
- The Sack Friars and the Problems of a Comparative History of the Mendicants: Andrews, F. E., 2017, Gli studi francescani: prospettive di ricerca: Atti dell’Incontro di studio in occasione del 30° anniversario dei Seminari di formazione Assisi, 4-5 luglio 2015. Spoleto: Centro Italiano di Studi sull'Alto Medioevo, p. 147-185 38 p

Professional and academic associations
Preceded by John Wolffe	President of the Ecclesiastical History Society; 2013–2014	Succeeded by Simon Ditchfield
