= Mission héliographique =

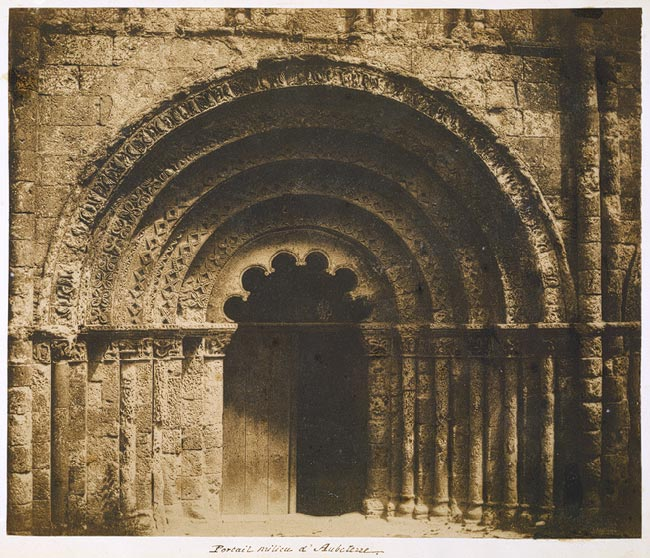
Central Portal of the Church of Saint-Jacques, Aubeterre - Gustave Le Gray (1851)

Mission héliographique was a 19th-century project to photograph landmarks and monuments around France so that they could be restored.

The project was established by Prosper Mérimée, France's Inspector General of Historical Monuments and author of Carmen, in 1851. The intent was to supplement monument historique, a program Mérimée started in 1837 to classify, protect and restore French landmarks. Mérimée hired Edouard Baldus, Hippolyte Bayard, Gustave Le Gray, Henri Le Secq and Auguste Mestral to carry out the photography, with the aim that architect Eugène Viollet-le-Duc could eventually restore them.

Although the daguerreotype originated in France, Mérimée preferred the calotype, which offered more detailed textures.

Mestral and Le Gray photographed areas southwest from Paris, Le Secq the north and east. Bayard, who chose to work with glass negatives instead of paper, went west to Brittany and Normandy. Baldus covered the south and east, including the Palace of Fontainebleau.

While several of the images are classic examples of early photography, the overall results did not meet requirements, often portraying the decaying buildings artistically and obscuring their need for restoration.
