= Herbert L. Kessler =

American historian (born 1941)

Herbert Leon Kessler (born 1941) is an American medieval art historian active in the late twentieth and early twenty-first century.

Kessler was born in Chicago, Illinois and studied at the University of Chicago (A.B. 1961) and Princeton University (M.F.A. 1963, Ph.D. 1965). He studied under Kurt Weitzmann at Princeton, and collaborated with Weitzmann on a number of projects. Kessler taught at the University of Chicago (1965–1976), and the Johns Hopkins University (1976–2013), and has held numerous fellowships and temporary appointments. Kessler's early work centered on pictorial imagery in the Carolingian Empire, and he has gone on to write many books and articles on different aspects of medieval art history, including medieval image theory and the visual representation of spiritual subjects.

Kessler has influenced the field of medieval art history through his prolific publication record and his role as a doctoral advisor. He has trained numerous doctoral students, including many who have become well-known art historians in their own right.

== Awards ==
- Fellow of the American Academy of Arts and Sciences, 1995
- Medieval Academy of America, 1991
- Guggenheim Fellow, 1972

== Publications ==
Kessler's scholarly output has been prolific. Some of his publications include:

=== Books ===
(This is only a partial list)

- The Illustrated Bibles from Tours (1977)
- The Cotton Genesis (1986; with Kurt Weitzmann)
- The Frescoes of the Dura Synagogue and Christian Art (1990; with Kurt Weitzmann)
- The Poetry and Paintings in the First Bible of Charles the Bald (1997; with Paul E. Dutton)
- Rome 1300: On the Path of the Pilgrim (2000; with Johanna Zacharias)
- Spiritual Seeing: Picturing God’s Invisibility in Medieval Art (2000)
- Seeing Medieval Art (2004)
- Neither God nor Man. Texts, Pictures, and the Anxiety of Medieval Art (2007)
- Experiencing Medieval Art (2019)

=== Articles ===
(This is only a partial list)

- “Scenes from the Acts of the Apostles on Some Early Christian Ivories” Gesta 18 (1979), pp 109–119
- “On the State of Medieval Art History” Art Bulletin 70 (1988), pp 166–187
- “Christ the Magic Dragon” Gesta 48 (2009), pp 119–134
- “They Preach not by speaking out loud but by signifying"; Vitreous Arts as Typology” Gesta 51 (2012), pp 55–70
