= Auguste Mestral =

French photographer

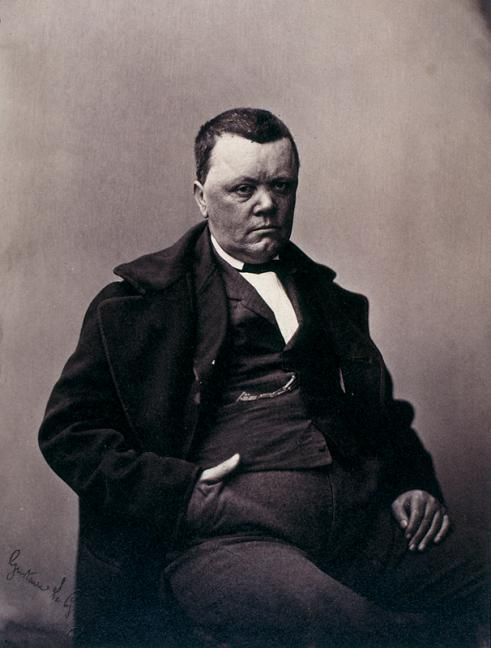
Auguste Mestral in a photographic portrait (1856) by Gustave Le Gray

Auguste Mestral (1812–1884), also known as O. Mestral, was a French photographer. He travelled with fellow photographers Édouard Baldus, Henri Le Secq, and Gustave Le Gray in the summer of 1851 to photograph architectural monuments in France at the request of the Commission des Monuments Historiques.

== Gallery ==
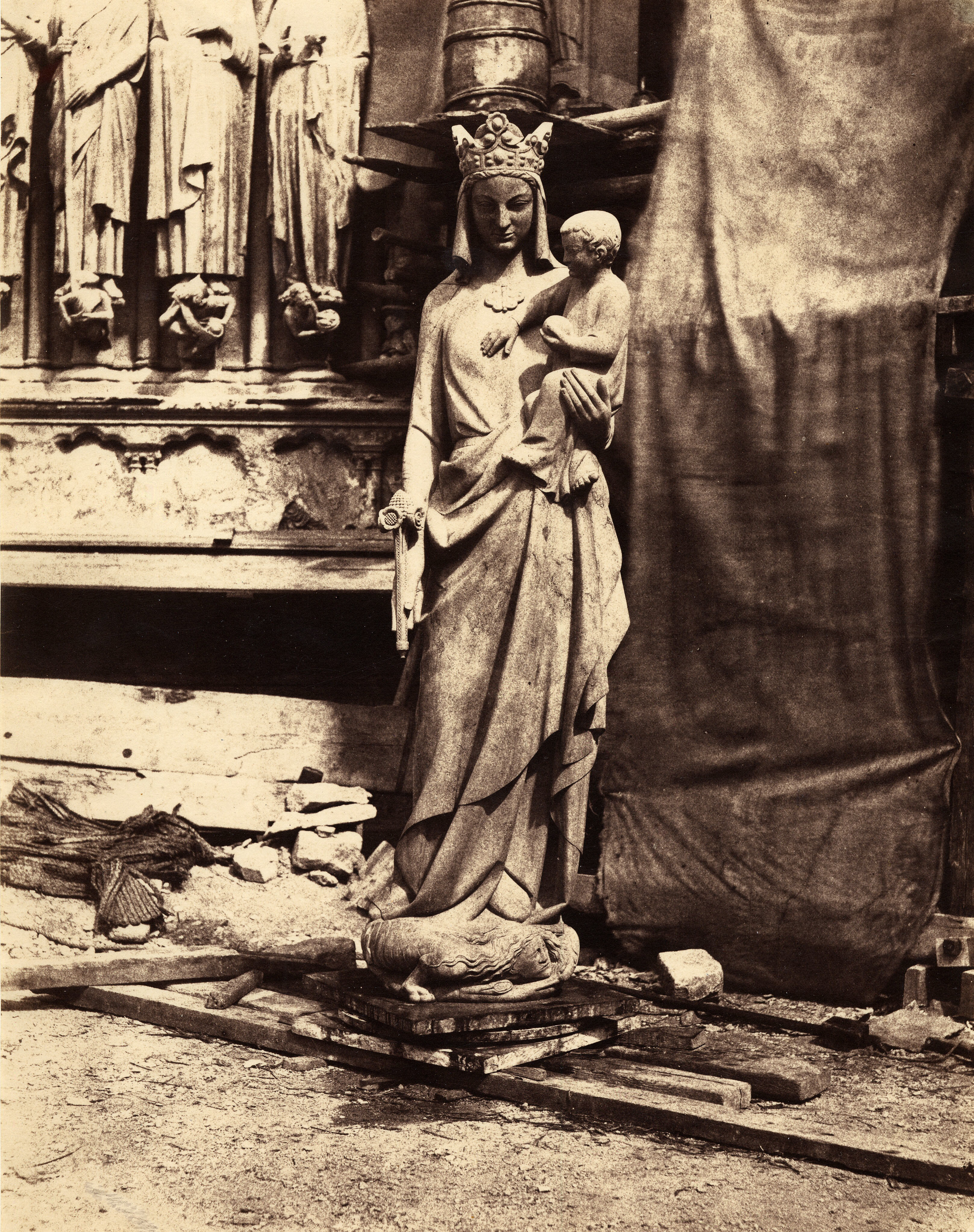
Sculpture of Virgin and Child (circa 1851), Notre-Dame de Paris

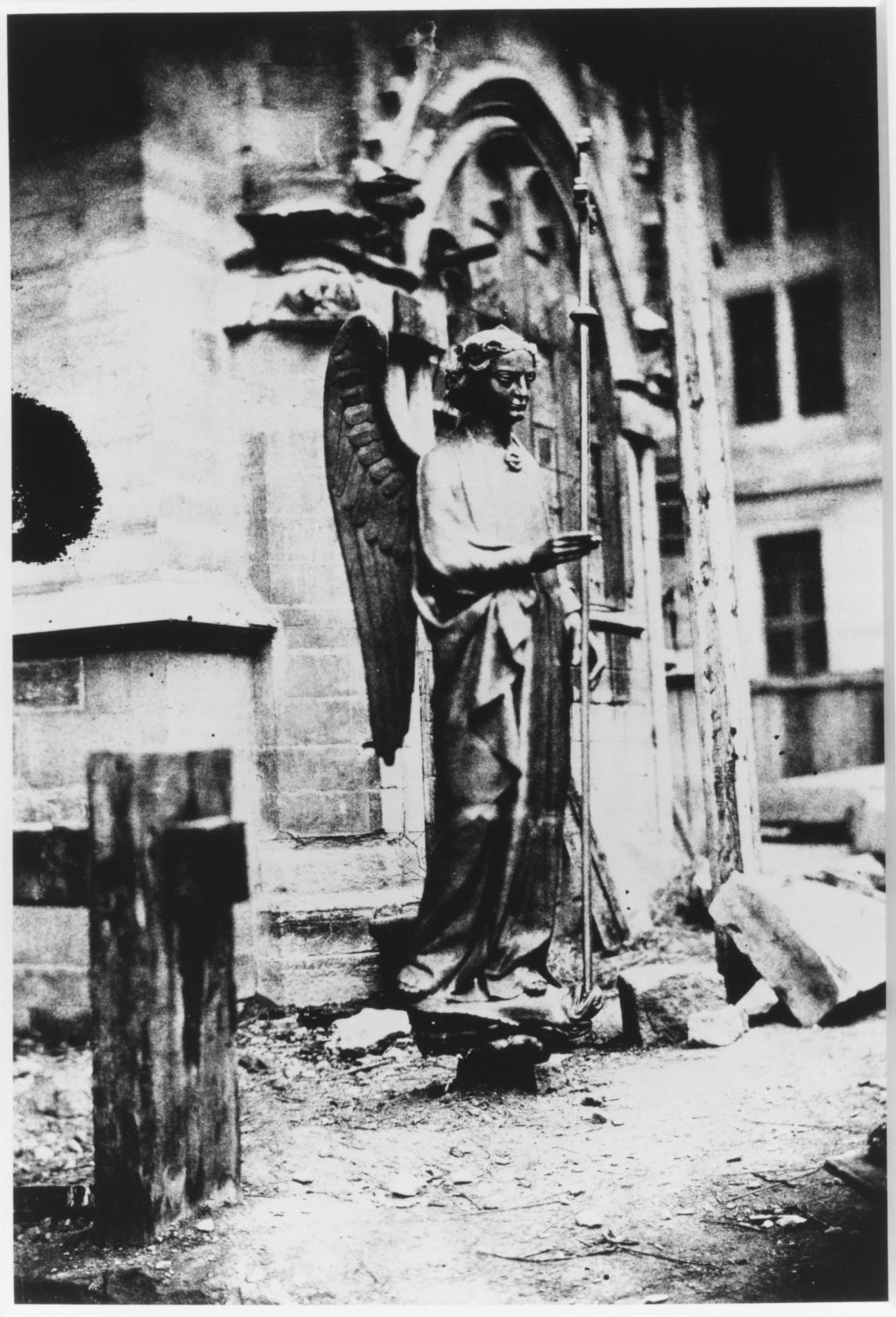
Sculpture of Angel at Sainte-Chapelle, Paris (circa 1851)

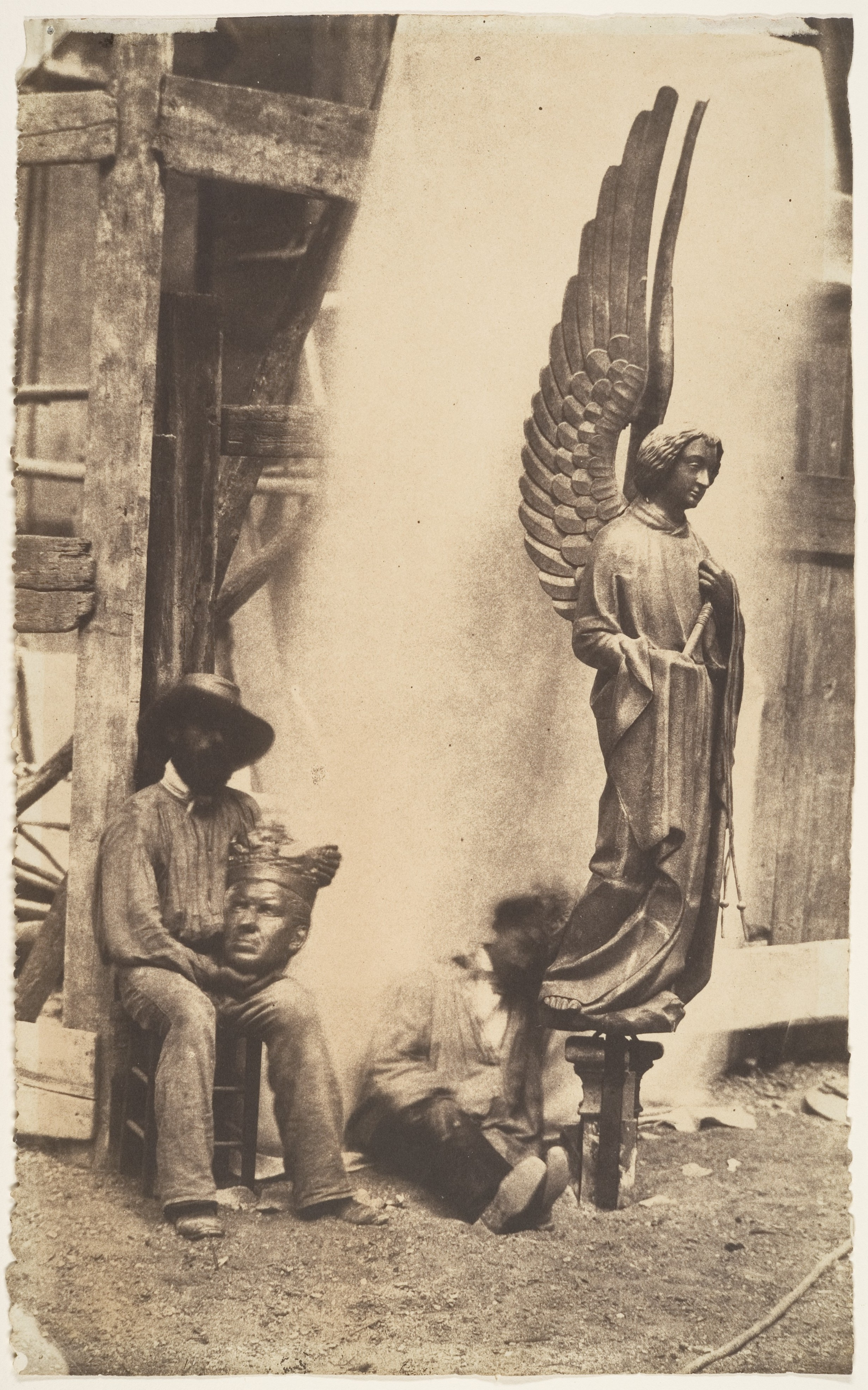
Angel of the Passion (1853), Sainte-Chapelle, Paris

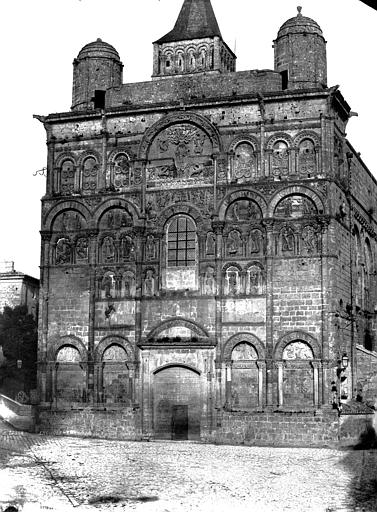
Cathédrale St-Pierre à Angoulême (1851) credited to Auguste Mestral and Gustave Le Gray
