= Routledge Studies in Medieval Religion and Culture =

Routledge Studies in Medieval Religion and Culture is a book series published by Routledge about the religion and culture of medieval Europe. The series editors are George Ferzoco and Carolyn Muessig.

== Selected titles ==
- The Barbarian North in Medieval Imagination: Ethnicity, Legend, and Literature, Robert W. Rix, 2014. ISBN 9781138820869
- Envisaging Heaven in the Middle Ages, Carolyn Muessig & Ad Putter, 2006. ISBN 0415383838
- The Invention of Saintliness, Anneke B. Mulder-Bakker, 2002. ISBN 0415267595
- Medieval Monstrosity and the Female Body, Sarah Alison Miller, 2010. ISBN 9780415873598
- Representations of Eve in Antiquity and the English Middle Ages, John Flood, 2010.

== See also ==
- Medieval World Series
- Studies in the History of Medieval Religion
