= Medieval World Series =

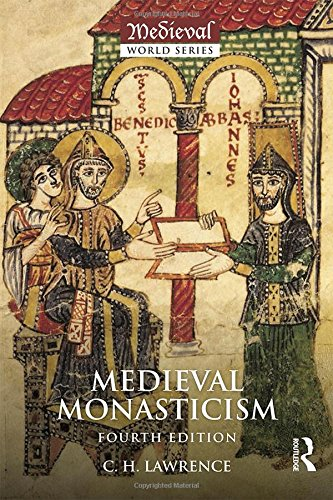
The cover of the fourth edition of Medieval Monasticism by C.H. Lawrence, 2015.

The Medieval World Series is a history book series published first by Longman and later by Routledge. Works in the series are intended to be an introduction to the authors' specialist subjects and a summing up of the current scholarship and debates of the relevant subjects.

The founding editor of the series was David Bates. Julia M.H. Smith was a former editor. The editor as of 2015 is Warren C. Brown.

== Selected titles ==
=== 2010s ===
- The Viking Diaspora, Judith Jesch, 2015.
- Medieval Monasticism: Forms of Religious Life in Western Europe in the Middle Ages, 4th Edition, C.H. Lawrence, 2015.
- The Cistercian Order in Medieval Europe 1090-1500, Emilia Jamroziak, 2013.
- Church and People in the Medieval West, 900-1200, Sarah Hamilton, 2013.
- The Cathars: Dualist Heretics in Languedoc in the High Middle Ages, 2nd Edition, Malcolm Barber, 2013.
- Disunited Kingdoms: Peoples and Politics in the British Isles 1280-1460, Michael Brown, 2013.
- Christian Jewish Relations 1000-1300: Jews in the Service of Medieval Christendom, Anna Sapir Abulafia, 2011.
- Violence in Medieval Europe, Warren C. Brown, 2010.

=== 2000s ===
- Europe's Barbarians AD 200-600, Edward James, 2009.
- Edward the Black Prince: Power in Medieval Europe, David Green, 2007.
- The Devil's World: Heresy and Society 1100-1300, Andrew Roach, 2005.
- The Mongols and the West: 1221-1410, Peter Jackson, 2005.
- The Crusader States and their Neighbours: 1098-1291, P.M. Holt, 2004.
- The Fourth Crusade: Event and Context, Michael J. Angold, 2003.
- The Godwins: The Rise and Fall of a Noble Dynasty, Frank Barlow, 2003.
- Margery Kempe and her world, A.E. Goodman, 2002.
- The Welsh Princes: The Native Rulers of Wales 1063-1283, Roger K. Turvey, 2002.
- Crime in Medieval Europe: 1200-1550, Trevor Dean, 2001.
- The Age of Robert Guiscard: Southern Italy and the Northern Conquest, Graham Loud, 2000.
- The Reign of Richard Lionheart: Ruler of The Angevin Empire, 1189-1199, Ralph V. Turner & Richard Heiser, 2000.
- The Age of Charles Martel, Paul Fouracre, 2000.
- The English Church, 940-1154, H.R. Loyn, 2000.

=== 1990s ===
- Ambrose: Church and Society in the Late Roman World, John Moorhead, 1999.
- Alfred the Great: War, Kingship and Culture in Anglo-Saxon England, Richard Abels, 1998.
- Abbot Suger of St-Denis: Church and State in Early Twelfth-Century France, Lindy Grant, 1998.
- Charles I of Anjou: Power, Kingship and State-Making in Thirteenth-Century Europe, Jean Dunbabin, 1998.
- Philip Augustus: King of France 1180-1223, Jim Bradbury, 1997.
- The Western Mediterranean Kingdoms: The Struggle for Dominion, 1200-1500, David S.H. Abulafia, 1997.
- The Formation of English Common Law: Law and Society in England from the Norman Conquest to Magna Carta, John Hudson, 1996.
- Bastard Feudalism, M.A. Hicks, 1995.
- Medieval Canon Law, James A. Brundage, 1995.
- Justinian, John Moorhead, 1994.
- English Noblewomen in the Later Middle Ages, Jennifer C. Ward, 1992.
- Charles The Bald, Janet L. Nelson, 1992.

== See also ==
- The Medieval Mediterranean (book series)
- Routledge Studies in Medieval Religion and Culture
