= Salt print =

Photographic process

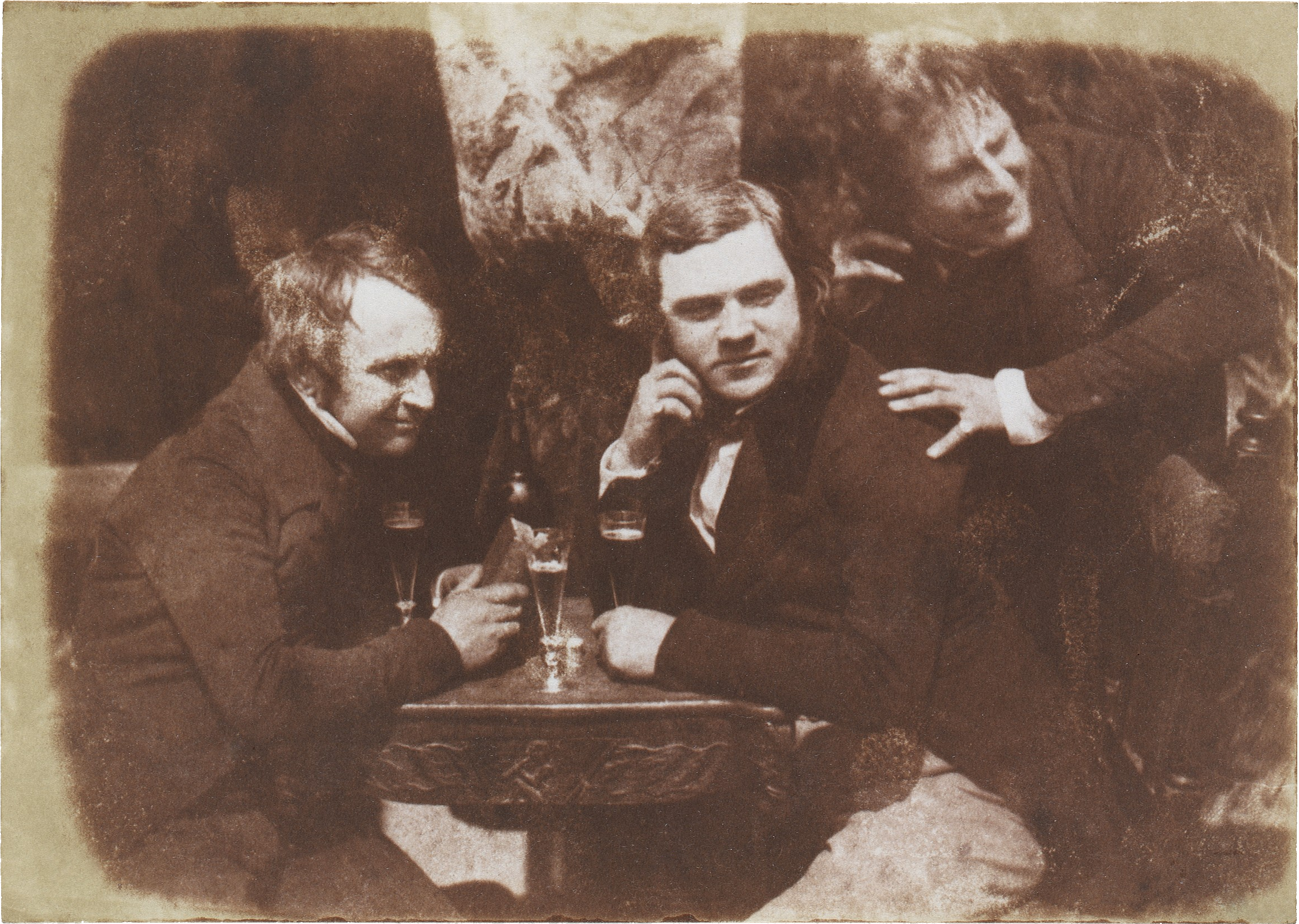
Edinburgh Ale: James Ballantine, Dr George Bell and David Octavius Hill by Hill & Adamson, a salt print from a calotype paper negative, c. 1844

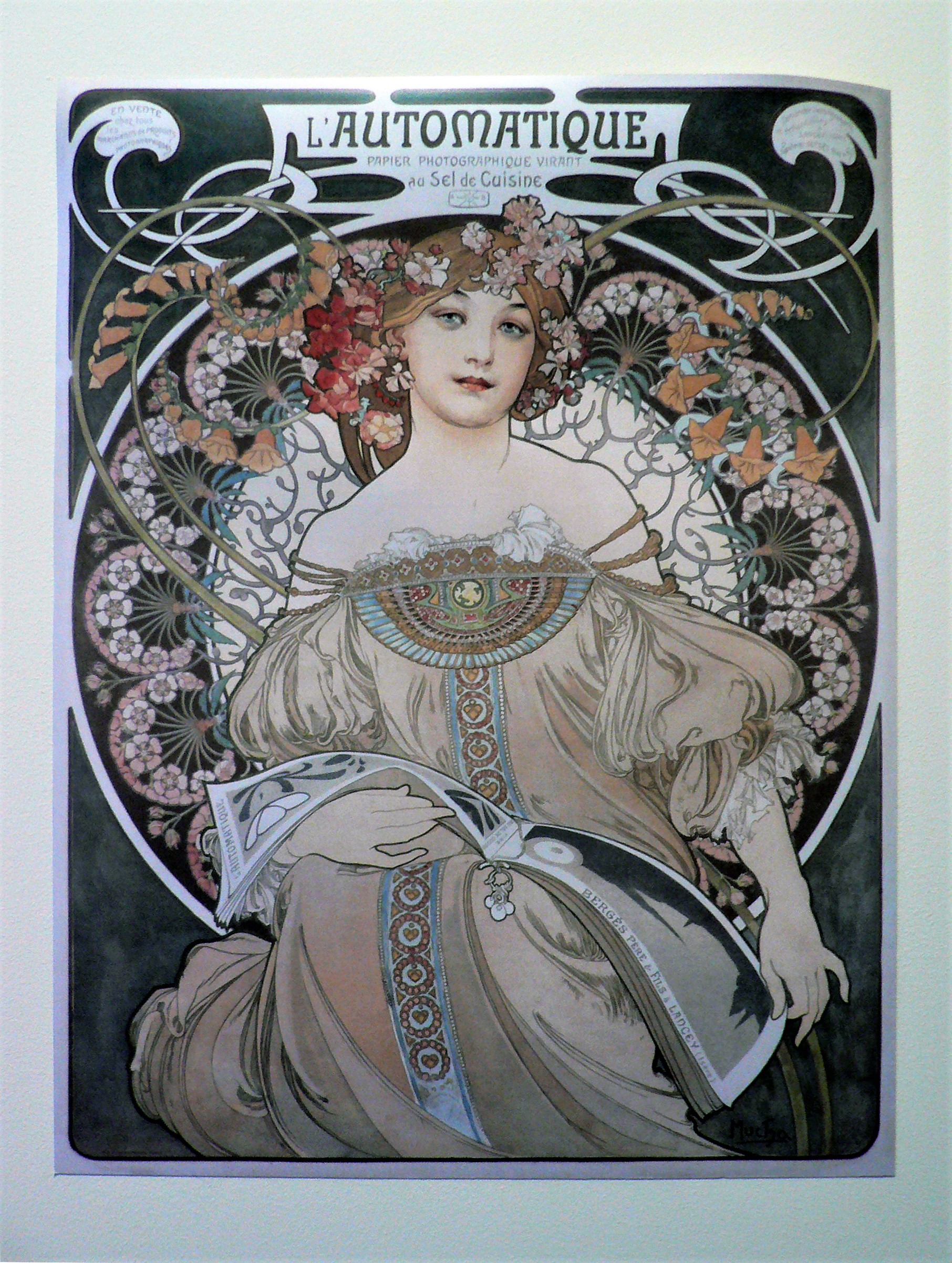
"Automatic photographic paper developed with table salt" by Alfons Mucha (1860–1939), for the Paper mill of Lancey.

The salt print was the dominant paper-based photographic process for producing positive prints (from negatives) from 1839 until the mid-1850s, when it was largely replaced by the albumen print.

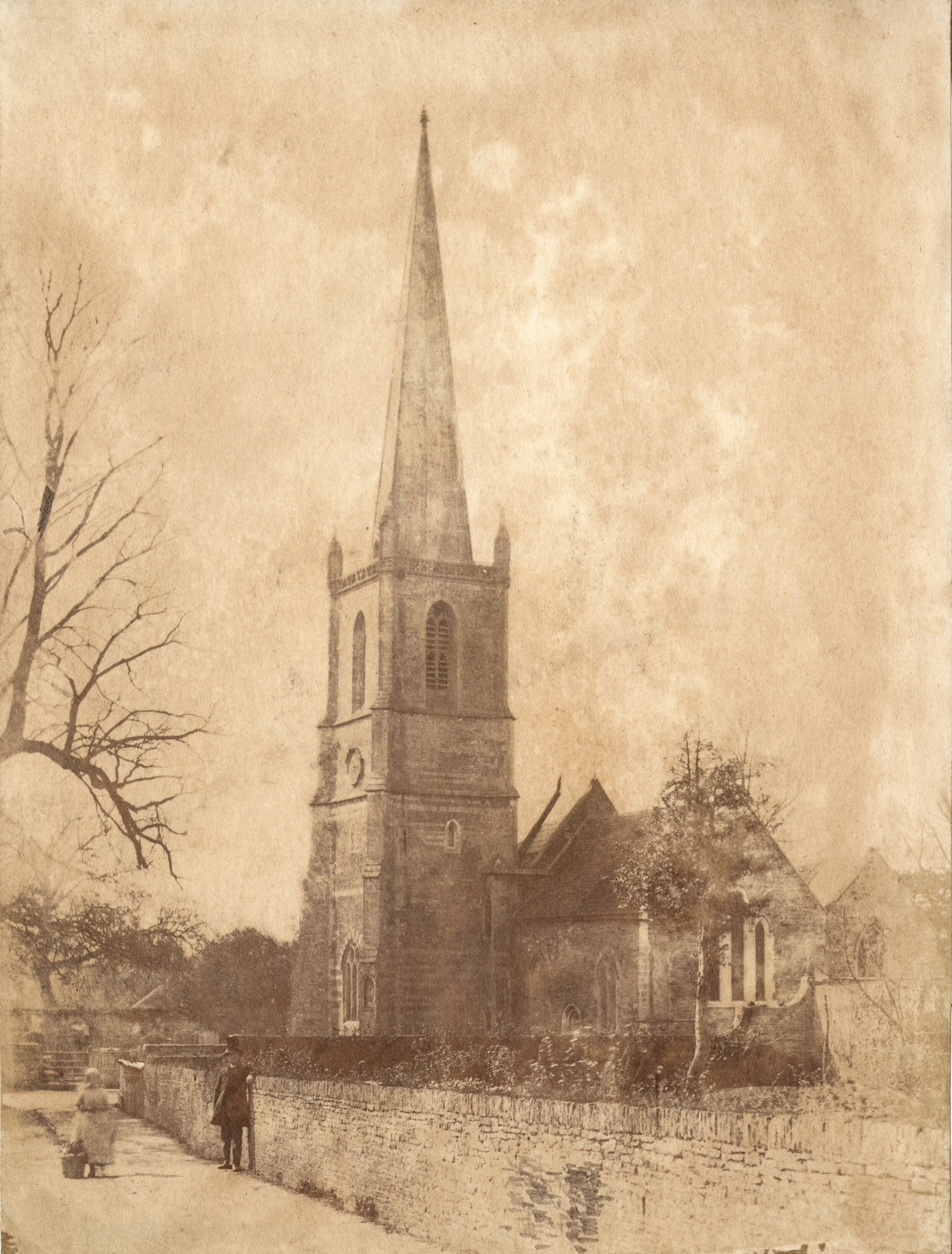
Saint Michael's Church, Winterbourne, April 1859, salted-paper print, Department of Image Collections, National Gallery of Art Library, Washington, DC

The salted paper technique was created in the mid-1830s by English scientist and inventor Henry Fox Talbot. He made what he called "sensitive paper" for "photogenic drawing" by wetting a sheet of writing paper with a weak solution of ordinary table salt (sodium chloride), blotting and drying it, then brushing one side with a strong solution of silver nitrate. This produced a tenacious coating of silver chloride in an especially light-sensitive chemical condition. The paper darkened where it was exposed to light. When the darkening was judged to be sufficient, the exposure was ended and the result was stabilized by applying a strong solution of salt, which altered the chemical balance and made the paper only slightly sensitive to additional exposure. In 1839, washing with a solution of sodium thiosulfate ("hypo") was found to be the most effective way to make the results truly light-fast. This method of fixing was proposed by John Herschel, and Talbot used it for most of his prints from the early 1840s.

== Process ==
To make a salt print, paper is soaked in a salt solution and dried; the salt can be sodium chloride, but sodium citrate and ammonium chloride are also often used. It is then coated with a silver nitrate solution of around 12 percent by weight, forming light-sensitive silver chloride. The dried paper is exposed to ultraviolet light, such as sunlight, in contact with a negative until the image is darker than required. It is then washed, toned if desired (usually in a gold toner), fixed in about 5 percent sodium thiosulfate or dilute print fixer, and washed again. Untoned salt prints range in color from light brown to reddish brown.

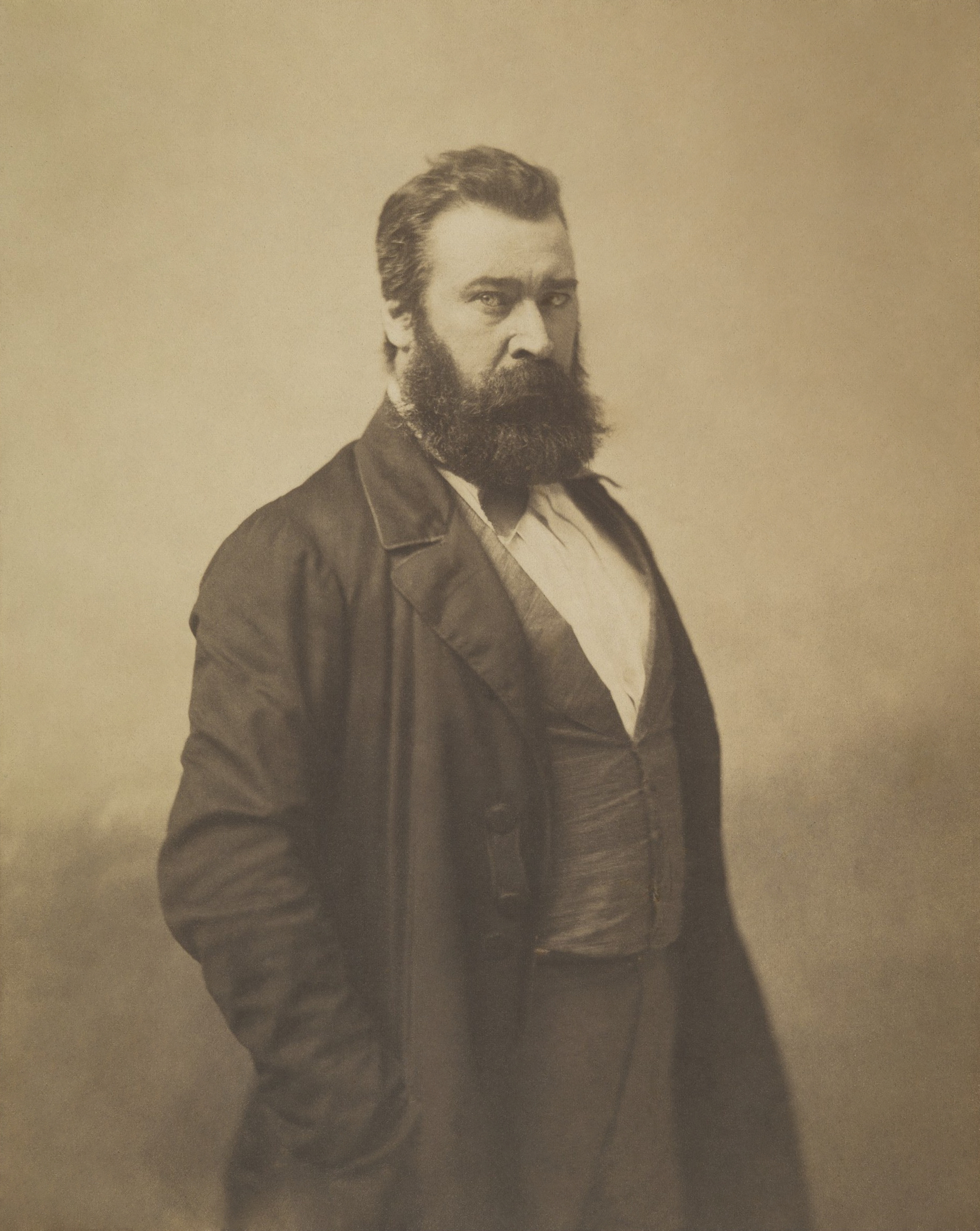
Portrait of Jean-Francois Millet by photographer Felix Nadar.

The salt print process is often confused with Talbot's slightly later 1841 calotype or "talbotype" process, in part because salt printing was mostly used for making prints from calotype paper negatives rather than live subjects. Calotype paper employed silver iodide instead of silver chloride. Calotype was a developing out process, not a printing out process like the salt print. The most important functional difference is that it allowed a much shorter exposure to produce an invisible latent image which was then chemically developed to visibility. This made calotype paper far more practical for use in a camera. Salted paper typically required at least an hour of exposure in the camera to yield a negative showing much more than objects silhouetted against the sky. Gold toning, proposed by P. E. Mathieu in 1847, was used to modify the tone of salt prints and to stabilize the silver image.

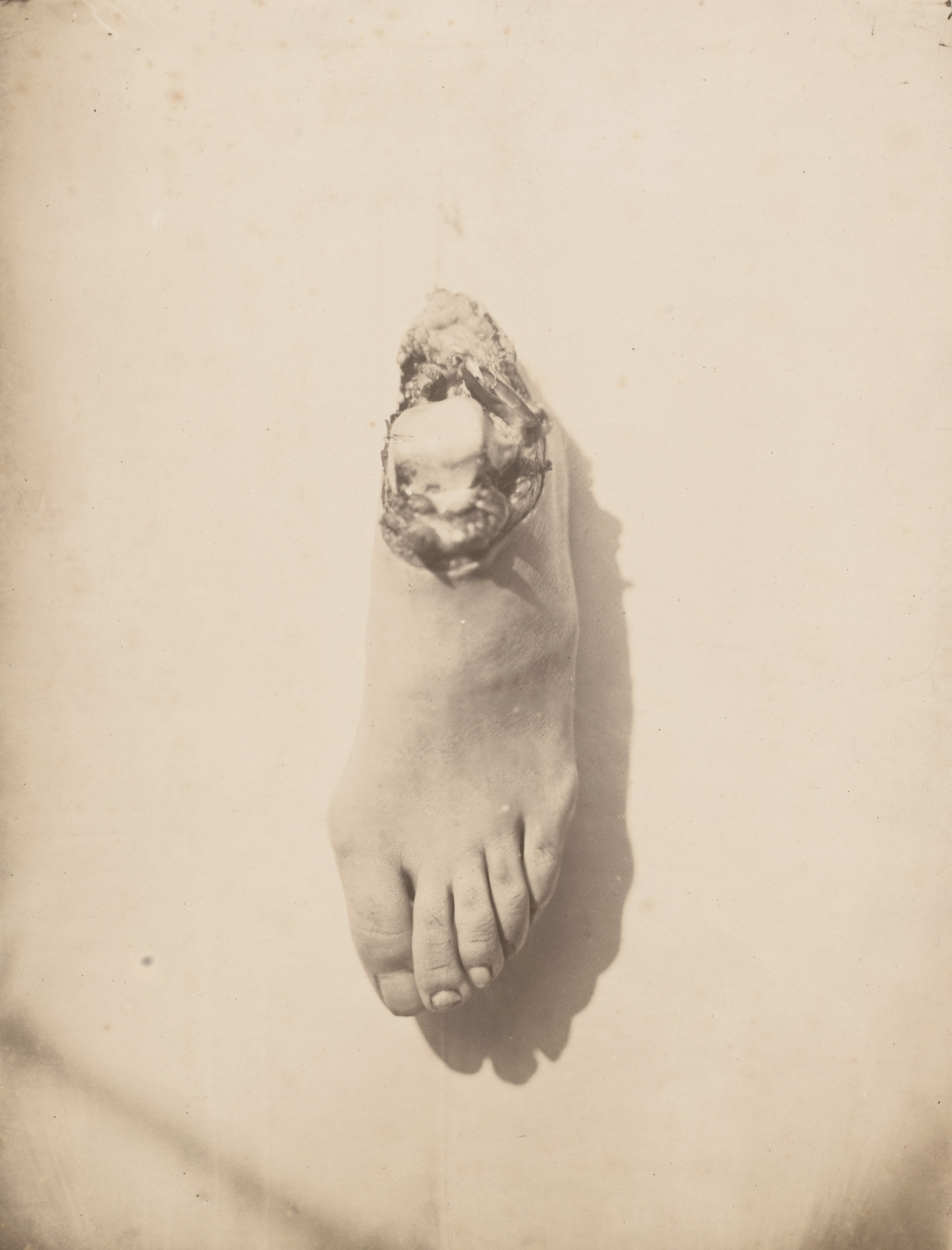
Unknown photographer, Untitled, c. 1855, Salted paper print, 36 x 27.4 cm, MoMA

== Contemporary uses of the salt print ==
In the 21st century, salt prints remain a niche method in the art photography world. However, a growing number of contemporary artists and photographers are using the salt print methods in their work.

Since the advances of digital negatives, it is now possible to create salt prints using digital photos which can be manipulated in digital darkroom software such as Photoshop to create highly suitable negatives for the salt process.

Different emulsions are now used including sodium chloride or ammonium chloride mixed with binding agents such as gelatine and arrowroot for varying resulting qualities. Many of the issues with preserving salt prints in the past have been resolved through research over many decades. Salt prints that have been processed and stored correctly can last for many generations.

== Sources ==
- Taylor, Roger. Impressed by Light: British Photographs from Paper Negatives, 1840-1860 (NY, Metropolitan Museum of Art, 2007)
