= Édouard Baldus =

French photographer (1813–1889)

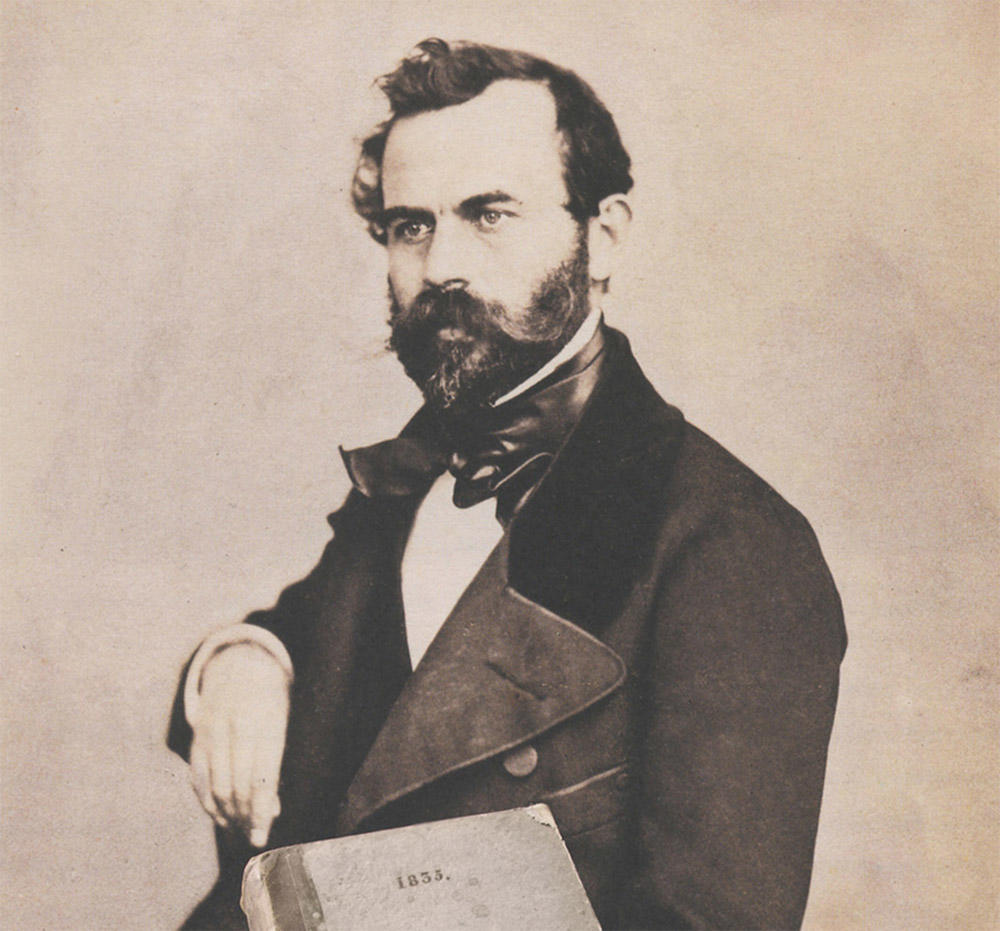
- Édouard Baldus, Self-portrait (c. 1853).
- Born: 5 June 1813; Grünebach
- Died: 22 December 1889
- Occupation: Photographer

Édouard Baldus (5 June 1813, Grünebach, Prussia – 1889, Arcueil) was a French landscape, architectural and railway photographer.

== Biography ==
=== Early life ===
Édouard-Denis Baldus was born on 5 June 1813 in Grünebach, Prussia. He was originally trained as a painter and had also worked as a draughtsman and lithographer before switching to photography in 1849.

=== Career ===
In 1851, he was commissioned for the Missions Héliographiques by the Historic Monuments Commission of France to photograph historic buildings, bridges and monuments, many of which were being razed to make way for the grand boulevards of Paris, being carried out under the direction of Napoleon III's prefect Baron Georges-Eugène Haussmann. The high quality of his work won him government support for a project entitled Les Villes de France Photographiées, an extended series of architectural views in Paris and the provinces designed to feed a resurgent interest in the nation's Roman and medieval past.

In 1855, Baron James de Rothschild, President of Chemin de Fer du Nord, commissioned Baldus to do a series of photographs to be used as part of an album that was to be a gift to Queen Victoria and Prince Albert as a souvenir of their visit to France that year. The lavishly bound album is still among the treasures of the Royal Library at Windsor Castle. In 1856, he set out on a brief assignment to photograph the destruction caused by torrential rains and overflowing rivers in Lyon, Avignon, and Tarascon. He created a moving record of the flood without explicitly depicting the human suffering left in its wake.

=== Innovations in photography ===
Baldus was well known throughout France for his efforts in photography. One of his greatest assignments was to document the construction of the Louvre museum. He used wet and dry paper negatives as large as 10x14 inches in size. From these negatives, he made contact prints. To create a larger image, he put contact prints side by side to create a panoramic effect. He was renowned for the sheer size of his pictures, which ranged up to eight feet long for one panorama from around 1855, made from several negatives.

Despite the documentary nature of many of his assignments, Baldus was inventive in overcoming the limitations of the calotype process (described here). He often retouched his negatives to blank out buildings and trees, or to put clouds in white skies; in his composite print of the medieval cloister of St. Trophime, in Arles (1851), he pieced together fragments of 10 different negatives to capture focus in depth in a panoramic view of the interior space and also render detail in the brightly lit courtyard outside.

=== Death ===
He died in 1889 in Arcueil, France.

== Notable photographs ==
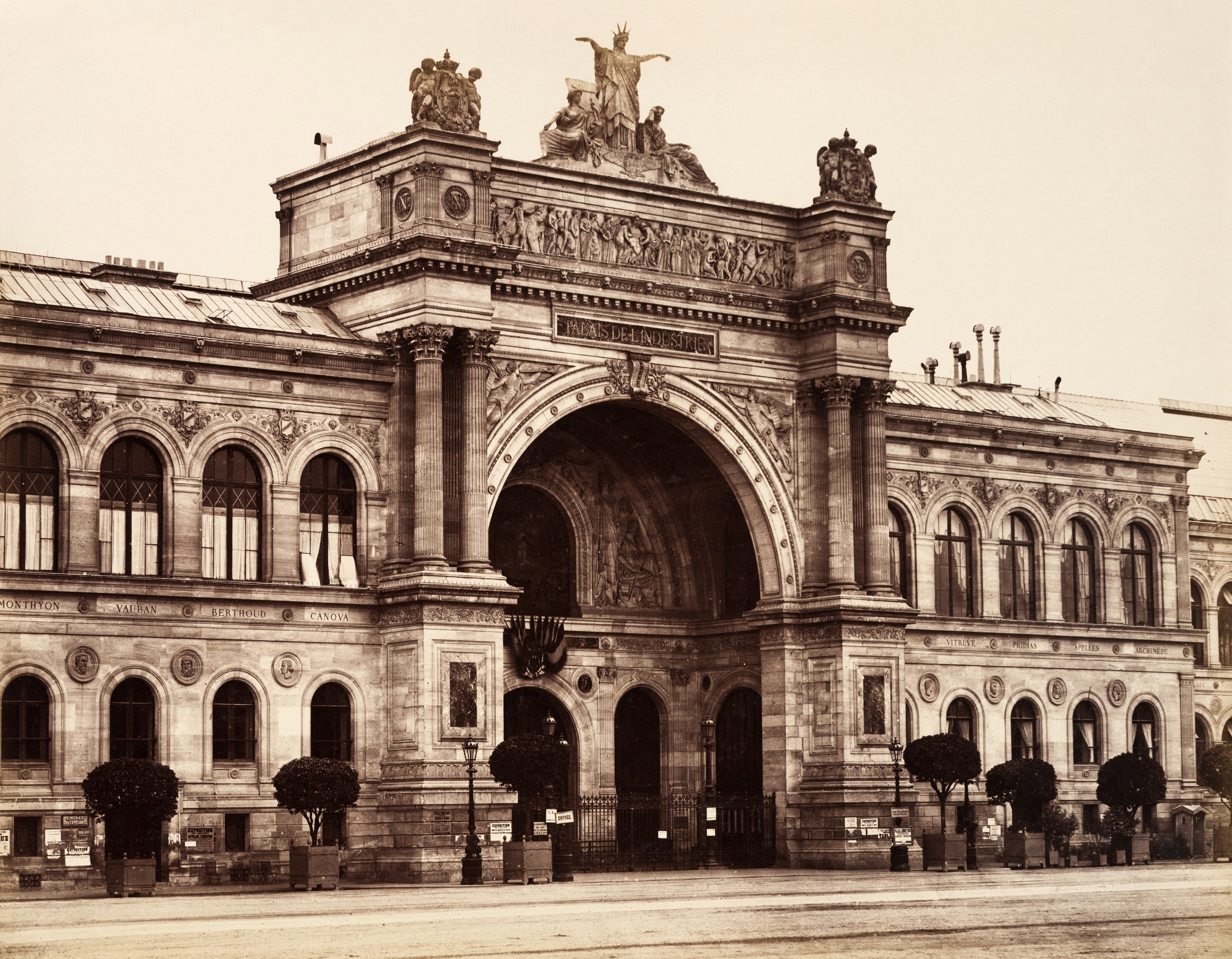
Palais de l'Industrie, c. 1860.

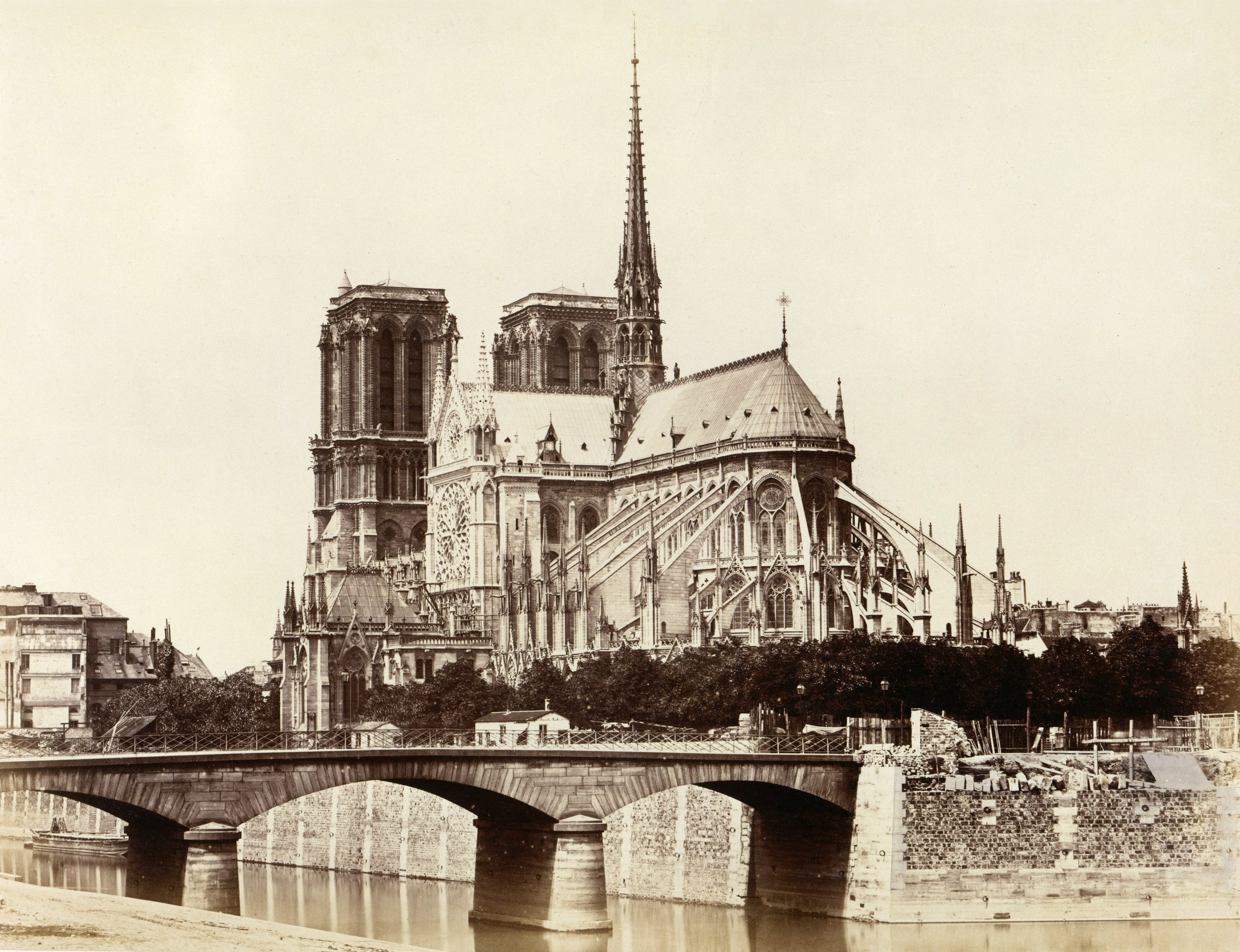
Notre-Dame, Paris

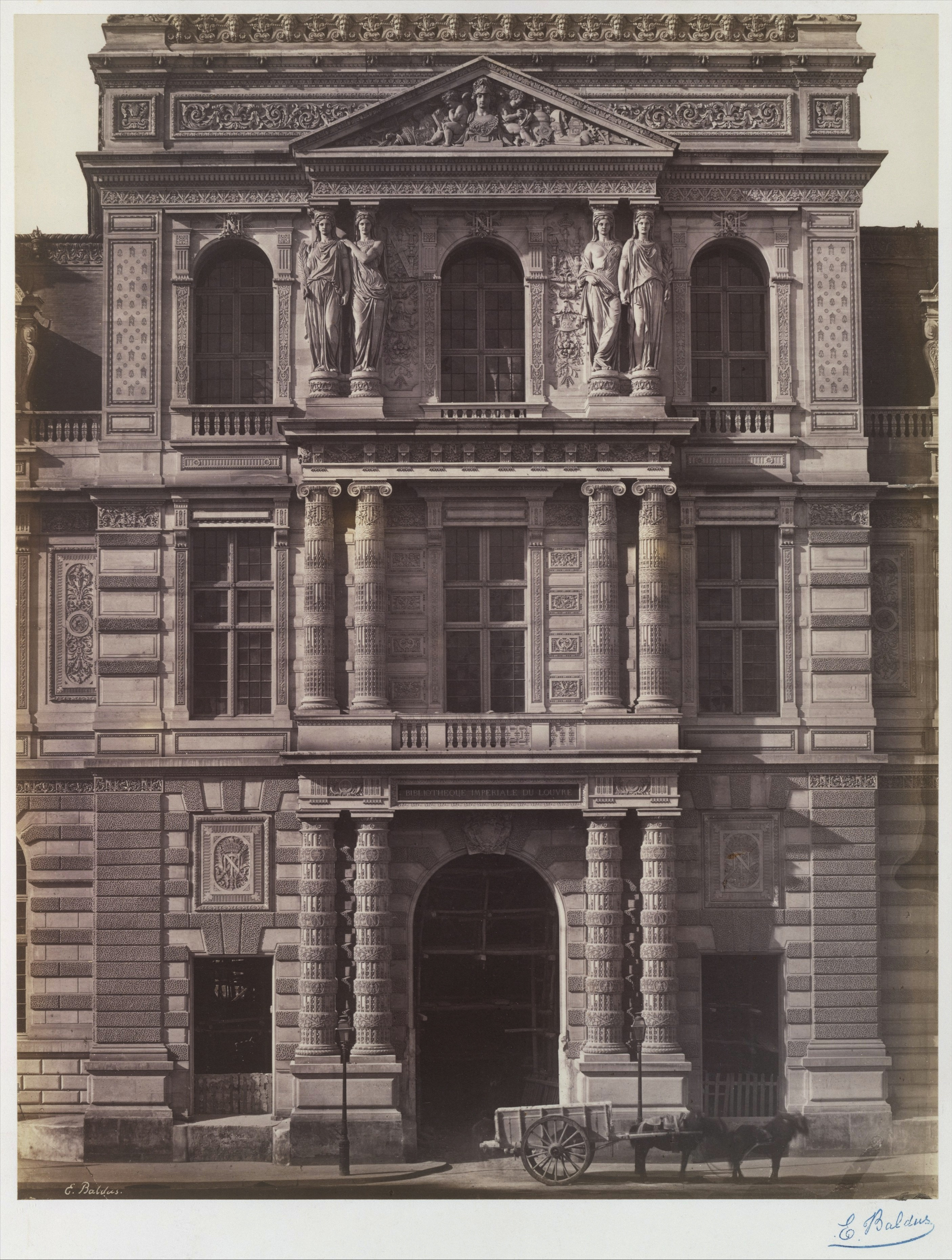
Imperial Library of the Louvre

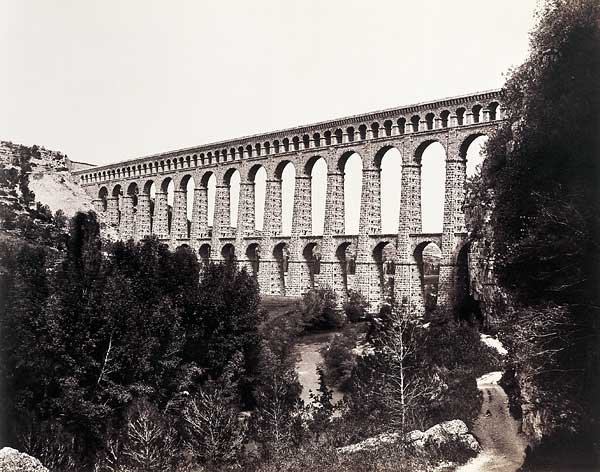
Roquefavour Aqueduct

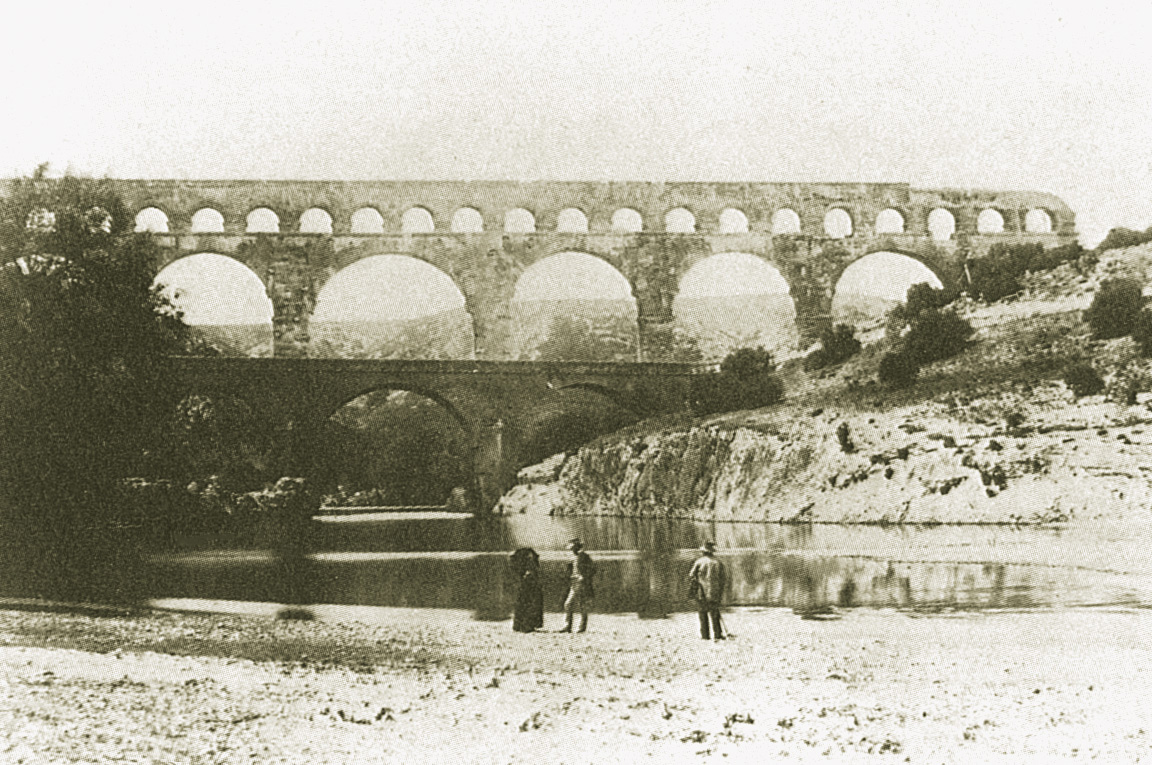
Pont du Gard

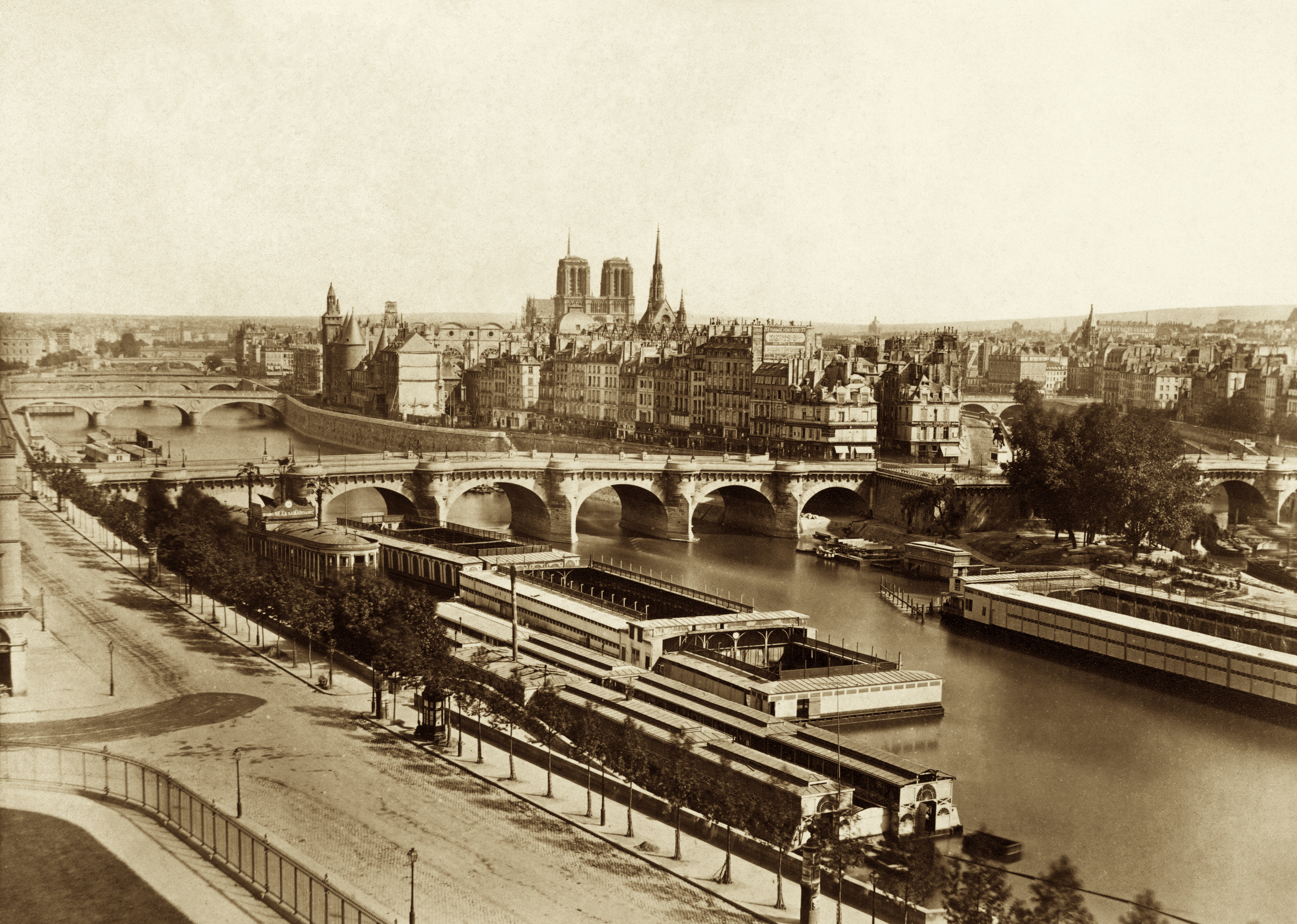
Panorama of Paris, about 1860

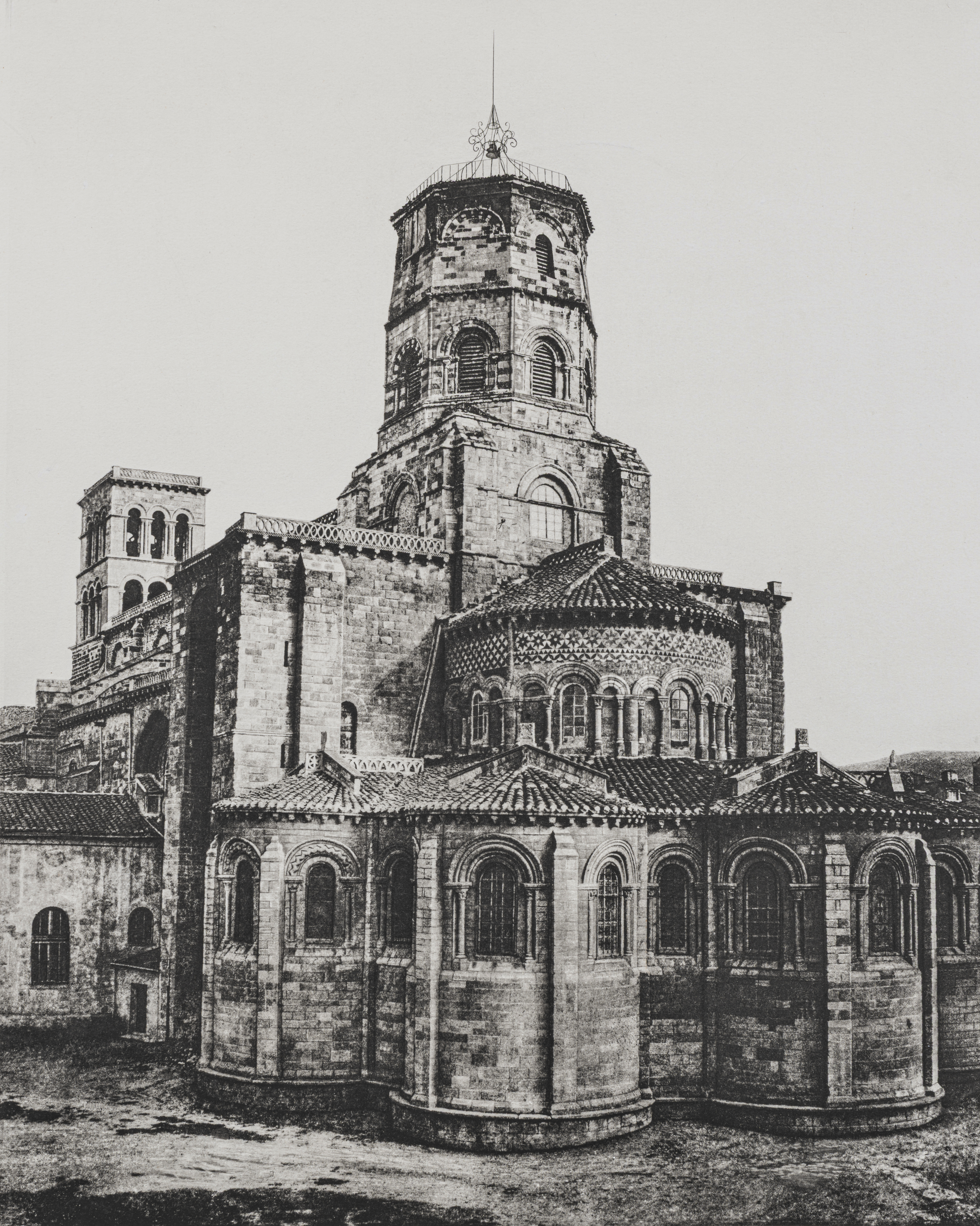
Basilica of Saint-Julian, Brioude
