= Alphonse Davanne =

French chemist and photographer (1824–1912)

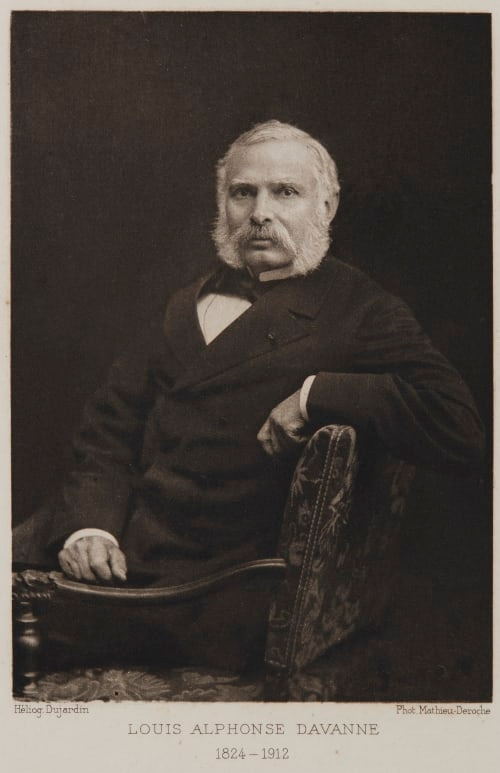
- Photograph by Mathieu-Deroche (reproduced in heliogravure by Paul Dujardin)
- Born: Louis-Alphonse Davanne; 12 April 1824; Paris, France
- Died: 1 January 1912 (aged 87); Saint-Cloud, France
- Awards: Officer of the Legion of Honour (1889); Knight of the Order of Leopold II
- Scientific career
- Fields: Chemistry, photography

Louis-Alphonse Davanne (French pronunciation: [alfɔ̃s davan]; 12 April 1824 – 19 September 1912) was a French chemist, photographer, and writer.

== Early life ==
Davanne was born in Paris on 12 April 1824.

== Career ==
In 1852, the French chemist embraced photography as his profession. His own photographs were signed "A. Davanne".

Alphonse Davanne was a founding member of the French Society of Photography (Société française de photographie) in 1854 and served on the board of directors. He was also a member of the Royal Photographic Society. At the general meeting of the French Photographic Society on 16 July 1858, Davanne presented uranium prints made by Louis Alphonse de Brébisson and read out a letter from him explaining his photographic process.

During the 1850s, he re-explored bitumen of Judea as a medium for Photoengraving, naming his technique litho-photographie. In 1858, Davanne contributed to a work published in Paris under the title Photographic chemistry (French: Chimie photographique) in collaboration with French chemist and physiologist Charles-Louis Barreswil. In January 1863, he worked alongside French chemist Aimé Girard on the action of nitrate of silver upon albumen. He was admitted to the Chemical Society of Paris (Société chimique de Paris) in 1864. He later published the Photographic Directory in 1865.

In the 1870s, Davanne held the position of vice president for the French Society of Photography, becoming its president in 1876. He was also a professor of photography at the National School of Bridges and Highways (French: École Nationale des Ponts et Chaussées).

He was appointed as a member of the awards jury at the Paris Exhibition of 1878.

In 1885, Davanne wrote about French inventor Nicéphore Niepce, publishing his work under the title Nicéphore Niepce, inventeur de la photographie.

In August 1887, The English Mechanic and World of Science highlighted that Davanne announced a 1000 franc prize for a photographic plate combining the benefits of both gelatin and collodion, with a submission deadline of 31 December 1888.

In 1888, he was nominated to the organizing committee for the first International Congress of Photography, established to coincide with the Universal Exhibitions. He held the position of vice president under Jules Janssen, the committee's president, alongside astronomer Charles Wolf. He presided over the awards jury at the Exposition Universelle in Brussels in 1888 and Paris in the following year. Davanne, the chairman of the board of directors of the French Photographic Society, was appointed as president of the awards jury for the Exposition Universelle of 1889.

He was distinguished as an Officer of the Legion of Honour in 1889.

By 1892, Davanne presided over the council of the French Society of Photography and was a delegate of the French Association for the Advancement of Sciences (French: Association française pour l'avancement des sciences).

He was later appointed to the commission for the Antwerp International Exposition in 1894.

In 1900, at the Paris Exposition, he was the vice president for the photography category (i.e. materials, processes, and products), where he worked alongside president Étienne-Jules Marey, rapporteur Léon Vidal, and secretary Michel Berthaud.

== Death ==
Alphonse Davanne died on 19 September 1912 in Saint-Cloud, Hauts-de-Seine, France.

== Gallery ==
Photos by Alphonse Davanne

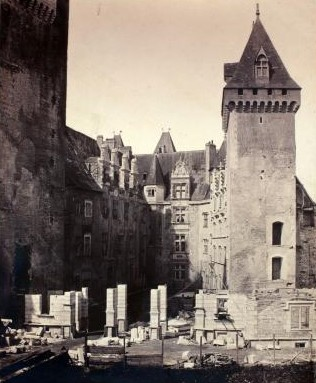
Construction Portique Château Pau

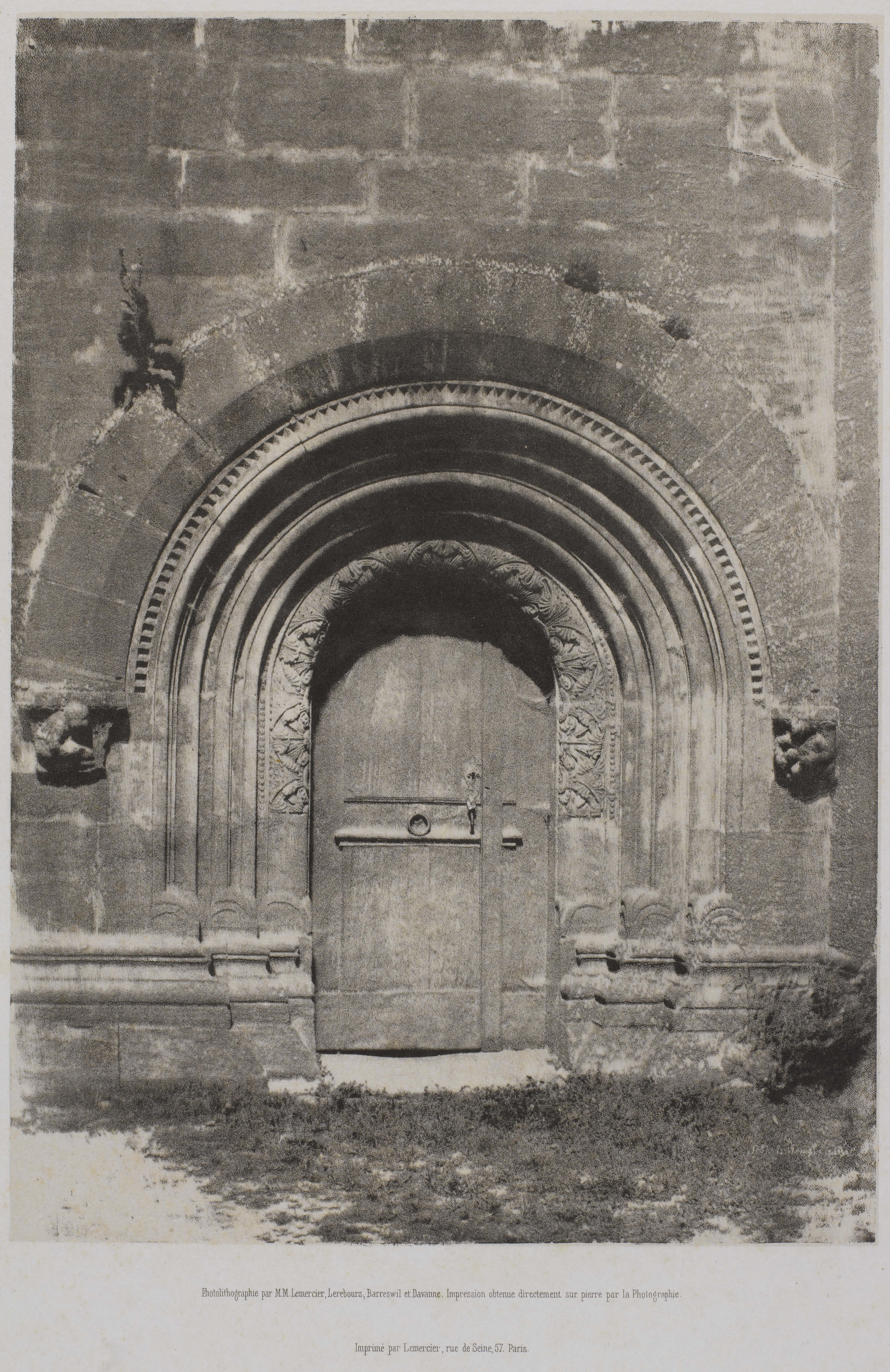
Portal of the Saint-Pierre-et-Saint-Paul Abbey Church

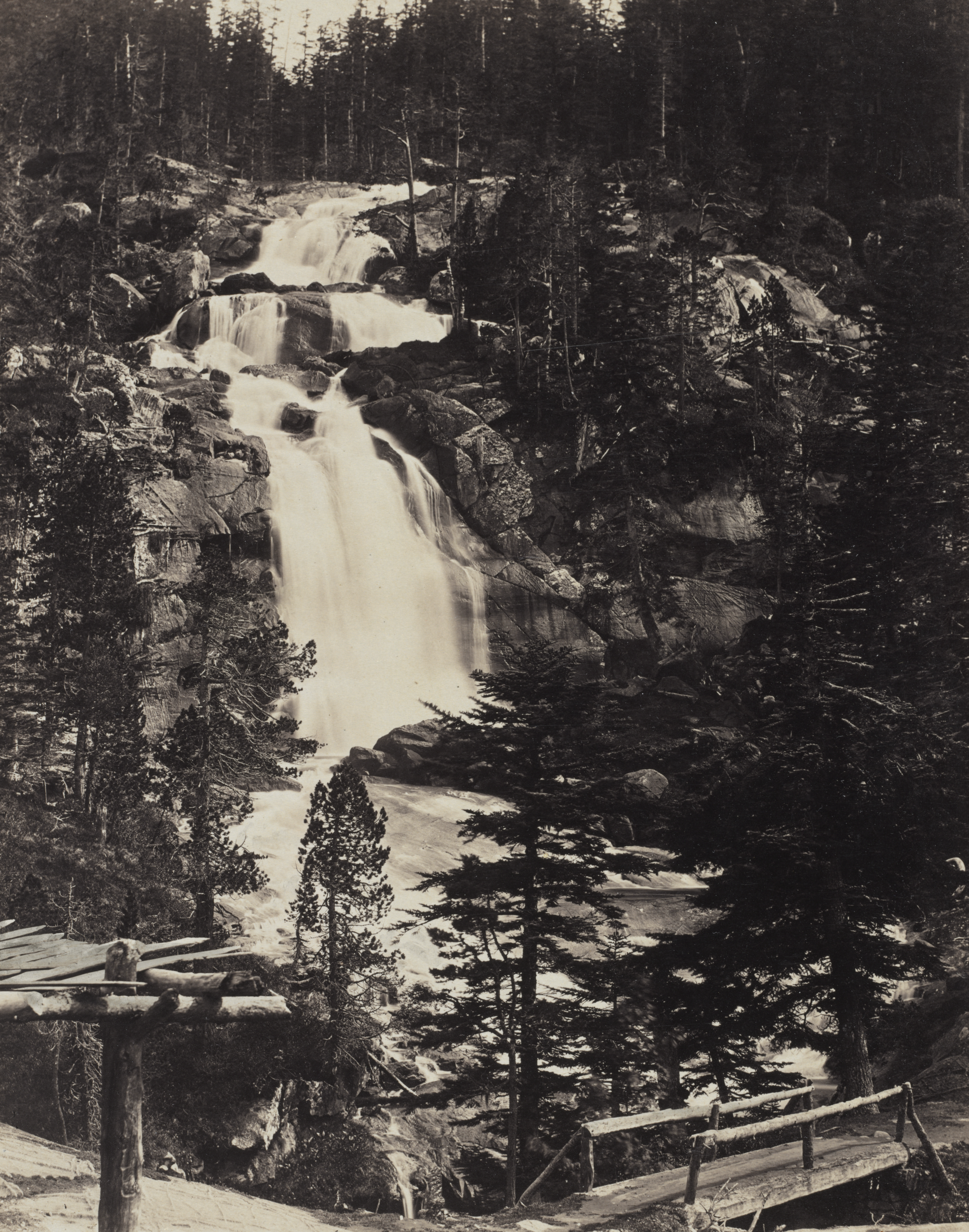
Great Upper Waterfall, High Alps
