= Anastas =

Anastas is both a surname and a given name. Anastas was also the male equivalent of female name Anastasia. Notable people with the name include:

Surname:

- Benjamin Anastas (born 1969), American novelist, journalist and critic born in Gloucester, Massachusetts
- Jonathan Anastas, Los Angeles-based advertising executive, musician, cofounded Boston hardcore punk bands
- Paul Anastas, the Director of Yale University's Center for Green Chemistry and Green Engineering
- Robert Anastas, former hockey coach and teacher at Wayland High School, in Wayland, Massachusetts

Given name:

- Anastas Avramidhi-Lakçe (1821–1890), Albanian businessman and benefactor
- Anastas Byku (died 1878), Albanian publisher and journalist
- Anastas Hanania (1899–1995), Jordanian-Palestinian lawyer, judge, official and diplomat
- Anastas Ishirkov (1868–1937), Bulgarian scientist, geographer and ethnographer
- Anastas Janullatos (1929–2025), Archbishop of Tirana, Durrës and All Albania
- Anastas Jovanović (1817–1899), Serbian photographer
- Anastas Kullurioti (1822–1887), Arvanite and Albanian nationalist figure, publisher and writer in Greece
- Anastas Mikoyan (1895–1978), Old Bolshevik and Soviet statesman of Armenian background
- Anastas Petrov (born 1973), retired Bulgarian footballer and the current manager of Lokomotiv Septemvri

== See also ==
- Anastasi (disambiguation)
- Anastasia
- Anastasija
- Anastasio
- Anastasiou
- Anastasius (disambiguation)
