= Michel Berthaud =

French photographer (1845–1912)

- Born: Michel Berthaud; 9 November 1845; Vienne, Isère, France
- Died: 9 November 1912 (aged 67); Paris, France
- Occupation: Photographer
- Known for: Photography

Michel Berthaud (9 November 1845 – 9 November 1912) was a French photographer.

== Early life and education ==
Michel A. Berthaud was born on 10 November 1845 in Vienne, Isère, France. Michel and his brothers Jean and Georges were known as the Berthaud Frères.

== Career ==
Berthaud was active in photography throughout the 1860s and 1880s.

In the 1860s, a photo studio belonging to Michel, Jean, and Georges Berthaud was established in Paris' 9th arrondissement at 9 Rue Cadet under the name "Maison Hélios". English photographer Eadweard Muybridge was trained in photography by the Berthaud brothers and was authorized to use their studio as a contact address in 1862.

Michel Berthaud was a significant member of the Trade Union Chamber of Photography (French: Chambre syndicale de la Photographie) and later became its president. Tasked with promoting the Exhibition of the Central Union of Fine Arts (French: Exposition de l'Union centrale des Beaux Arts) at the Palais de l'Industrie, he addressed a general meeting of the French Society of Photography (Société française de photographie) in June 1865.

From 1867 to 1870, Michel Berthaud and the French painter and printmaker Étienne-Prosper Berne-Bellecour were business associates, with Berthaud eventually succeeding Berne-Bellecour.

Berthaud notably took a photo of French theater actress Mlle Agar in 1868. A photograph of French painter Henri Regnault was taken at his studio around 1868–70. Regnault's portrait was later etched by Auguste Laguillermie after Berthaud.

Expanding their photography operations to eight cities in France, Berthaud and Berne-Bellecour planned a Troyes branch in 1868 under the name "Hélios." Troyes-based photographer Gustave Lancelot adopted the name first, leading to a lawsuit. On 7 December 1868, the Commercial Court ruled in Lancelot's favor, citing his prior use and the plaintiffs' lack of trademark registration. Lancelot kept the name, and the plaintiffs appealed.

Berthaud formally became a member of the French Society of Photography (French: Société française de photographie) in 1873.

Berthaud presided over the Trade Union Chamber of Photography by 1876–77. He contributed to the 1878 World's Fair in Paris by being on the admission jury for the "Photographic proofs and devices, applications, etc." category. In 1879, Berthaud used the collotype process for a portrait of Alphonse Louis Poitevin, mayor of Conflans.

In 1882, he was part of the Initiative Committee for the photographic section at the Central Union of Decorative Arts' exhibition.

Berthaud was appointed to the organization committee of the International Congress of Photography in 1888, with the event occurring in Paris the following August. In 1889, the Berthaud brothers captured the detail of the central dome of the Palais des Expositions diverses. At the Universal Exhibition of 1889, the French photographer earned a gold medal. He later, in 1894, took up the role of vice president for the committee in charge of the photography division at the Exposition Universelle in Antwerp.

From 1889 to 1908, Michel and his brothers ran a Parisian postcard publishing company known as B. F., Paris.

He was appointed to the role of vice president for the 1897 Brussels International Exposition's Organization Committee for the photography section.

In 1898, Berthaud was listed as a delegate for the National Union of Photographic Societies of France (French: Union nationale des Sociétés photographiques de France). He held the position of treasurer for the union founded in 1892.

During the 1900 Universal Exhibition in Paris, he was made secretary of the photography category, alongside Étienne-Jules Marey (president), Alphonse Davanne (vice president), and Léon Vidal (the rapporteur).

== Death ==
Michel Berthaud died in 1912 in Paris, France.

== Gallery ==
Photos by Michel Berthaud

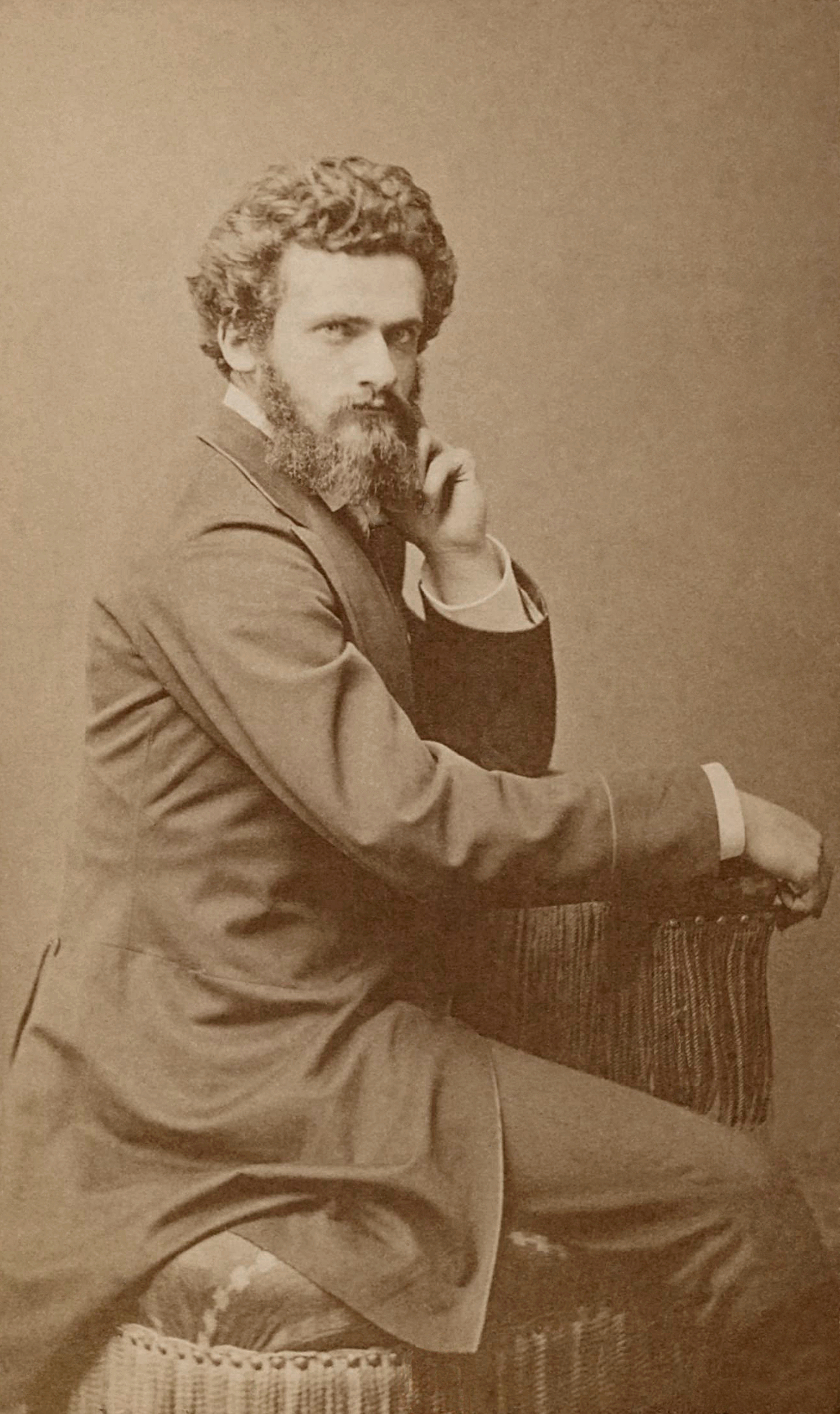
Henri Regnault

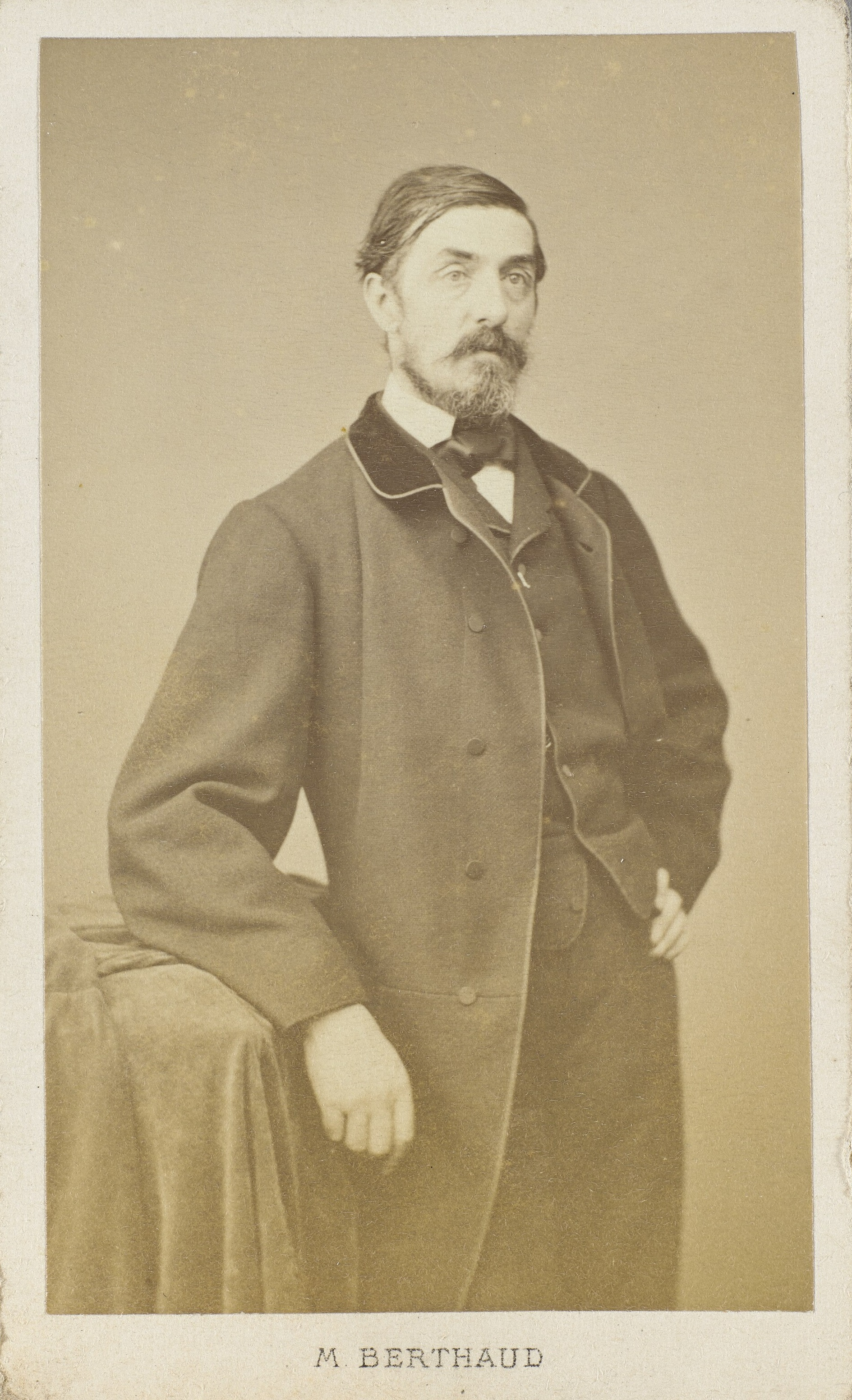
Auguste Anastasi

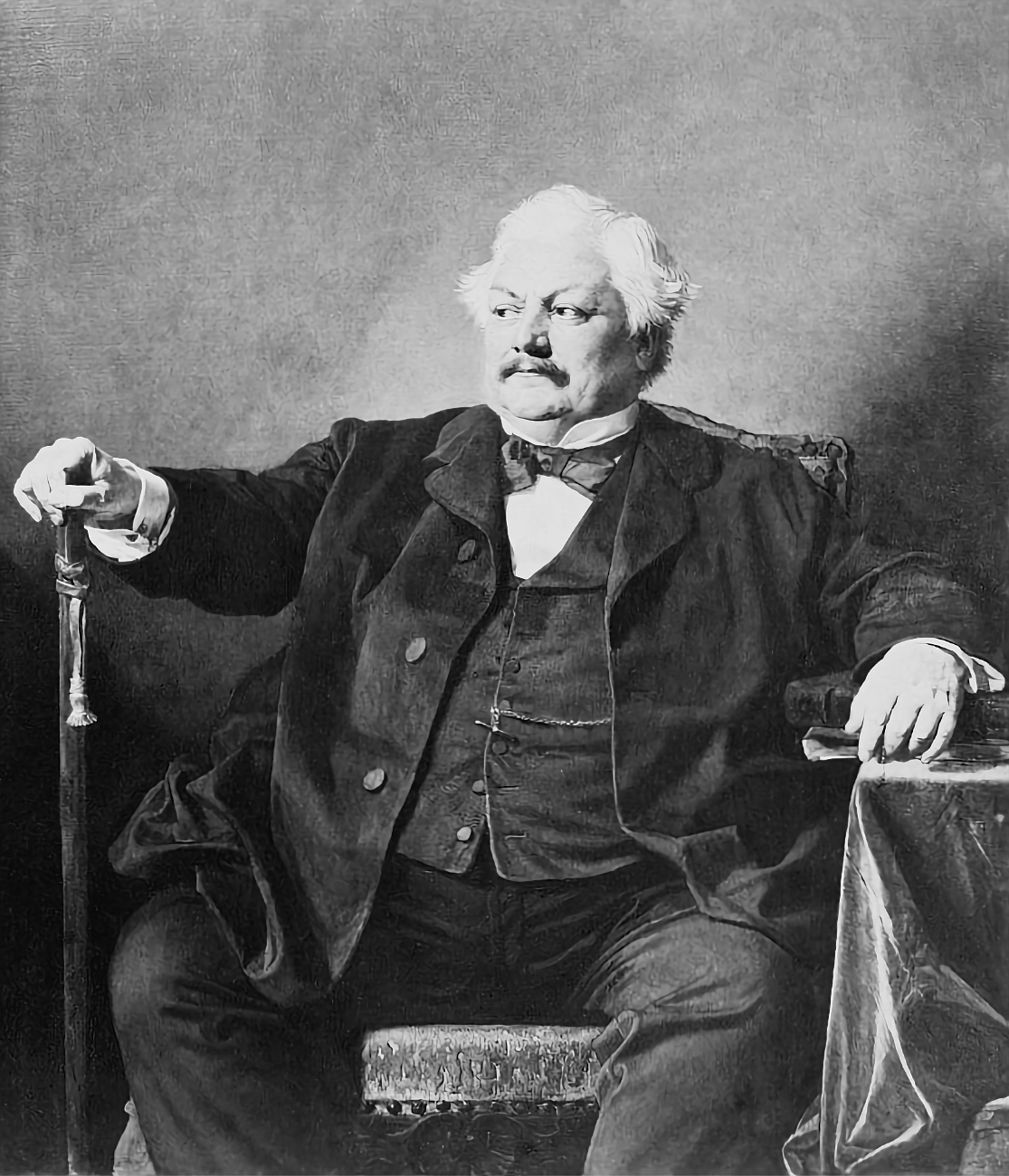
Léon Brisse

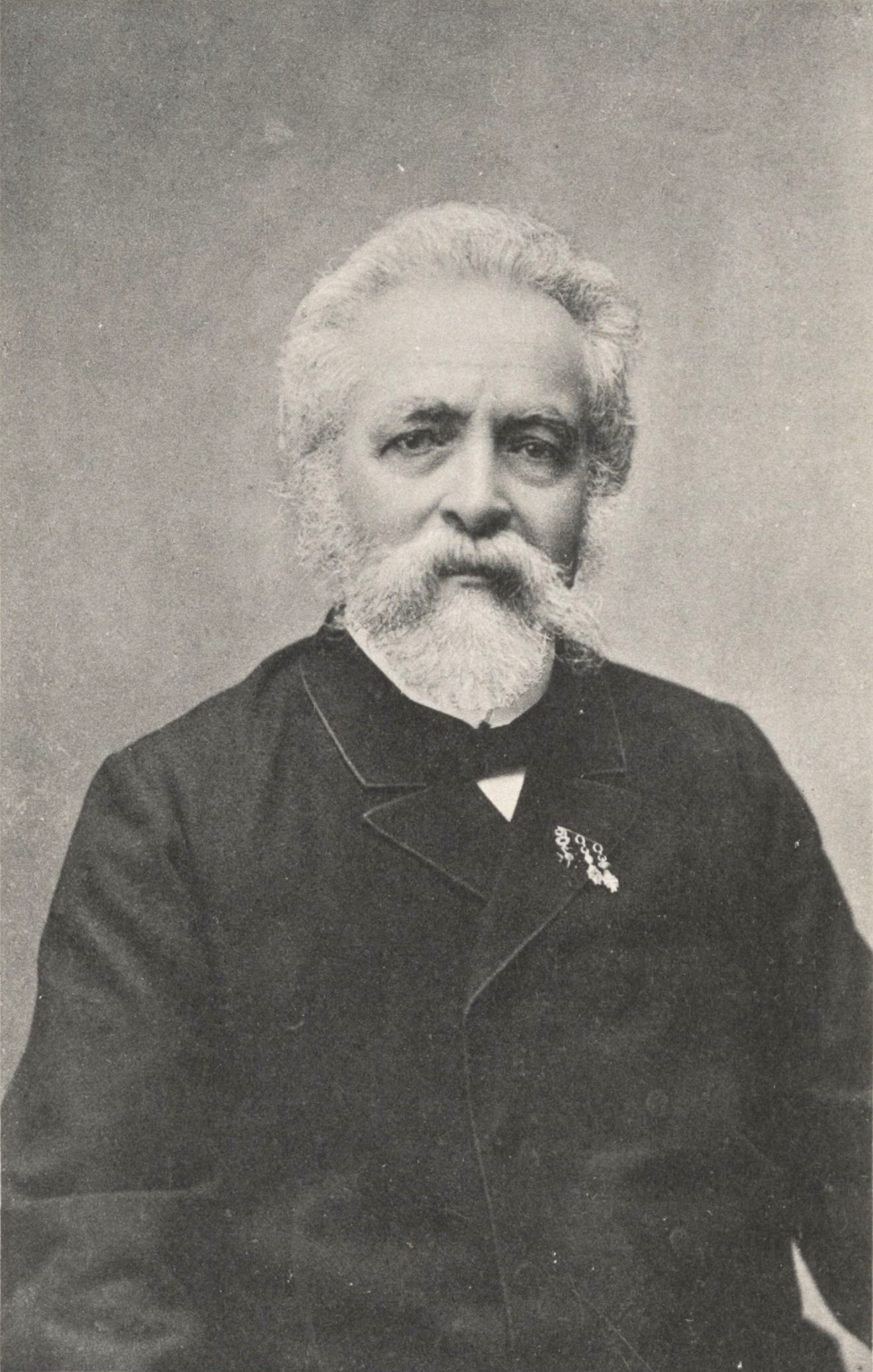
Alexandre Bonvarlet
