= Anastasi =

Anastasi may refer to:

== Surname ==
- Andrea Anastasi (born 1960), Italian volleyball player
- Anne Anastasi (1908–2001), American psychologist
- Auguste Anastasi (1820–1889), French landscape painter
- Giovanni Anastasi (1540–1587), Italian painter
- Giovanni Anastasi (merchant) (1780–1860), merchant and Swedish-Norwegian Consul-General in Egypt
- Maurizio Anastasi, Italian footballer
- Pietro Anastasi (1948–2020), Italian footballer
- Reo Stakis (1913–2001), hotelier born Argyros Anastasis
- Victor Anastasi (1913–1992), Maltese designer and draughtsman
- William Anastasi (1933–2023), American painter
- Shane Anastasi (born 1973), Australian-American Author and Businessman

== Other ==
- Papyrus Anastasi I, an ancient Egyptian papyrus

== See also ==
- Anastasia (surname)
- Anastasie
- Anastasis (disambiguation)
