= Paul-Louis Roubert =

Paul-Louis Roubert (born 1967) is an associate researcher at the Laboratoire d'histoire visuelle contemporaine, senior lecturer in photography at Paris 8 University and, since December 2010, president of the Société française de photographie.

Roubert was awarded a doctorate in 2004 on the basis of his thesis on L'Introduction du modèle photographique dans la critique d'art en France which led to L'Image sans qualités published in 2006. He has been closely connected to the Société française de photographie whose bulletin he edited from 1999 to 2004. Since 1996, He has been a founding member of the journal Etudes photographiques. He has lectured in the history of photography at Paris 8, Paris 1 and at the École des hautes études en sciences sociales. In December 2010, succeeding Michel Poivert, he was unanimously elected president of the Société française de photographie.

== Main publications ==
- "L'Image sans qualités". Les beaux-arts et la critique à l'épreuve de la photographie, 1839-1859, Paris, Monum, 2006.
- "Le daguerréotype en procès", Le Daguerréotype français. Un objet photographique (cat. exp.), Paris, Musée d’Orsay/RMN, 2003, p. 119-131.
- "1859. Exposer la photographie", Études photographiques.
