= Vever (surname) =

Vever or Vevera is a surname. Notable people with the surname include:

- Henri Vever (1854–1942), French jeweler
- Andreas Vevera (born 1971), Austrian para table tennis player
