= Louise Leghait =

Belgian photographer (1821–1874)

- Born: Louise Félicité Julie Reynders; 9 September 1821; Brussels
- Died: 22 April 1874 (aged 52); Paris
- Other names: Louise Le Ghait
- Occupation: Photographer
- Years active: 1850s

Louise Leghait, also known as Louise Le Ghait (9 September 1821 - 22 April 1874), was a Belgian photographer active during the 1850s in Brussels and Paris. She is considered to be the first Belgian woman who worked as an amateur photographer.

== Personal life ==
Louise Félicité Julie Reynders was born on 9 September 1821 in Brussels. She was the daughter of Jean Paul Ferdinand Reynders, a Brussels-based merchant born in Amsterdam in 1795 who married in Tournai in 1818. In 1840, at the age of eighteen, she married Gustave Nicolas François Leghait, a landowner, in Saint-Josse-ten-Noode and had three children with him: Alfred (1841) who became the Belgian Ambassador to France in 1903, Jenny (1843) and Raoul (1845).

== Photography ==
In the mid-1850s, Louise Leghait emerged as a photographer in Brussels under the name Madame Leghait. She is considered to be Belgium's first female calotypist and amateur photographer. In 1856, she became the first woman member of the Société française de photographie. Shortly afterwards, she was awarded a medal at the l'Exposition des arts industriels de Bruxelles (Brussels Industrial Arts Exhibition), along with her male counterparts Constant Delessert, Louis Désiré Blanquart-Evrard and Louis Adolphe Humbert de Molard.

The following year, she presented a series of photographic views of Mechelen, Brussels and Antwerp on at the second exhibition of the Société française de photographie. The press noted that Belgium was represented by "une dame, un artiste véritable, Mme Leghait, tient le premier rang" (Mme Leghait, a woman and artist of first rank), praised her technical skill, "all the more remarkable in a woman of the world who is guided only by her love of art" stating that she "exhibited pieces that closely resemble English photographs in terms of finesse and sharpness of line". After this date, few traces of her work remain.

== Later life ==
Her youngest son Raoul died in 1871, aged only twenty-five, and her husband died the following year. Louise Leghait died two years later at her home at 12 rond-point des Champs-Élysées in Paris on 22 April 1874.

== Collections ==
Prints held by the Société française de photographie.

== Exhibitions ==
- November 1981 - February 1982. La Femme artiste: d'Elisabeth Vigée-Lebrun à Rosa Bonheur, Mont-de-Marsan, musée Despiau-Wlérick, donjon Lacataye
- 4 October 2015 - 24 January 2016. Qui a peur des femmes photographes? Paris, musée d'Orsay, musée de l'Orangerie. Works lent by the Société française de photographie.
