= Anastasis =

Anastasis may refer to:

- Anastasis (Greek: ἀνάστασις), resurrection, most commonly the resurrection of Jesus
  - Anastasis, in Christian art, a pictorial representation of the Harrowing of Hell
  - Prote Anastasis, Holy Saturday, between Good Friday and Easter Sunday
  - Church of the Anastasis, an alternative name for the Church of the Holy Sepulchre, Jerusalem
  - Hagia Anastasis, an Arian cathedral in Ravenna now called the Chiesa dello Spirito Santo, next to the Arian Baptistry
- MV Anastasis, a vessel belonging to the health charity Mercy Ships
- Anastasis (album), a 2012 album by the band Dead Can Dance
- Gran Kiltias Anastasis, fictional character in Final Fantasy XII
- Cellular anastasis, the reversal of apoptosis

== See also ==
- Anasazi, the ancient Native American culture of the Four Corners
- Anastas, a masculine given name and a surname
- Anastasia, a feminine given name
- Anastasi (disambiguation)
- Anastasius (disambiguation)
- Anastatica, a genus of resurrection plant
