= Henri Vever =

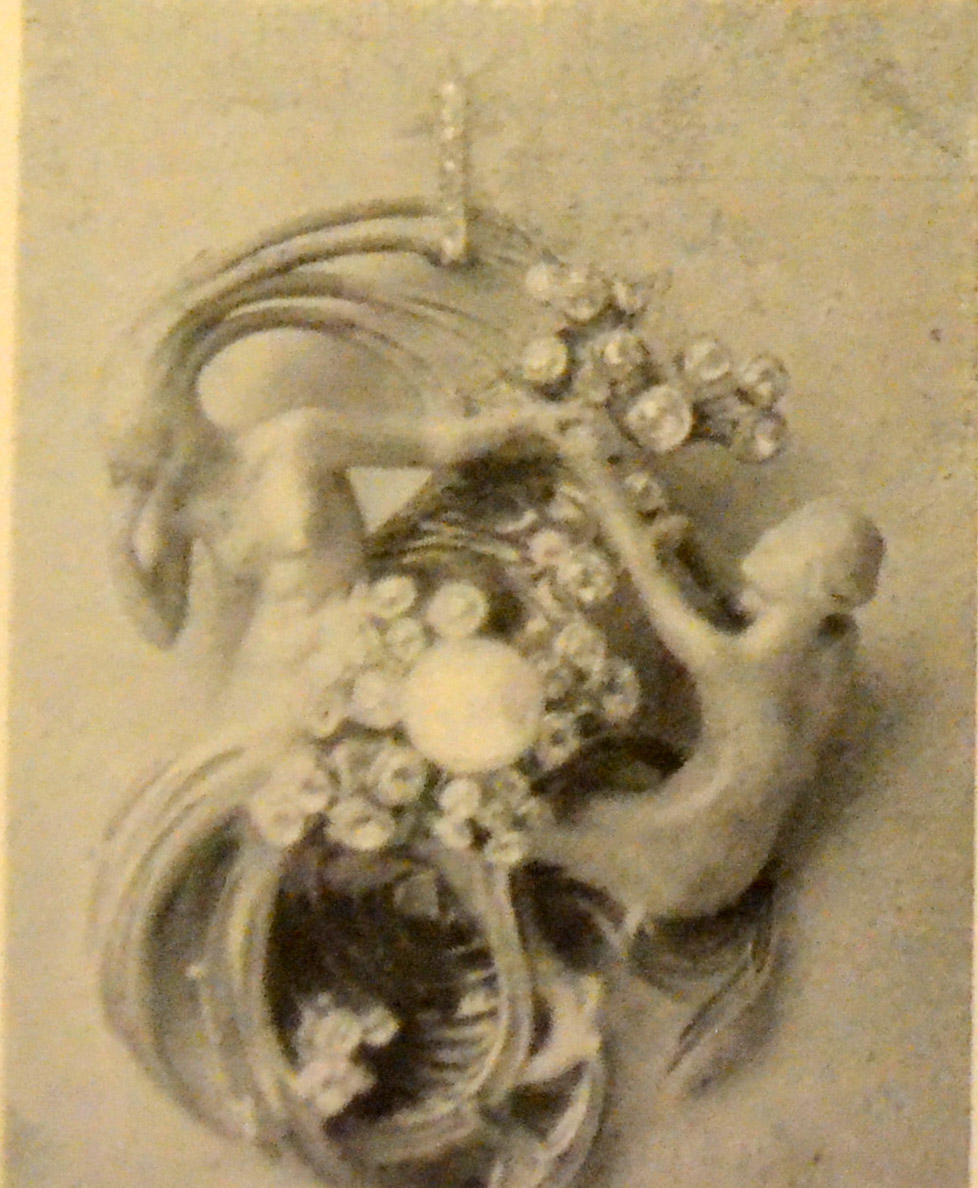
French Art jewel "art nouveau" made by Vever; Source: "La décoration et les industries d'art en 1900" ("The decor and art industries in 1900") in Revue illustrée (Bound Tome 1902)

Henri Vever (1854–1942) was one of the most preeminent European jewelers of the early 20th century, operating the family business, Maison Vever, started by his grandfather. Vever's jewelry designs were renowned for their innovative use of enamel and gemstones, drawing significant influence from Japanese art, particularly in his naturalistic motifs. His pieces exhibited at the 1900 Exposition Universelle in Paris solidified his reputation as a master of Art Nouveau jewelry. In collaboration with illustrator Eugène Grasset, Vever created innovative jewelry pieces that received acclaim at the Exposition, including intricate designs inspired by European mythology.

Vever was known for his innovative use of precious gemstones, such as rubies, emeralds, and sapphires, in contrast to other Art Nouveau jewelers who favored more affordable materials.

Henri was also a collector of a broad range of fine art, including prints, paintings, and books of both European and Asian origin. By the 1880s, Vever became one of the earliest Europeans to formally collect Japanese ukiyo-e woodblock prints, purchasing extensively from dealers such as Hayashi Tadamasa. He was a member of Les Amis de l'Art Japonais, a group of Japanese art enthusiasts including Claude Monet, that met regularly to discuss Japanese prints and other works over dinner.

By the early 20th century, Vever had amassed a collection of many thousands of fine ukiyo-e prints. His collection was so well regarded that the authors of some of the pioneering European scholarly works on ukiyo-e used Vever's collection for much their research on actual prints. Such authors include von Seidlitz, Migeon, and Lemoisne, whose L'Estampe Japonaise used Vever's prints exclusively. In 1924, Vever donated approximately a hundred pieces created by Maison Vever along with 250 French jewelry pieces to the Musée des Arts Décoratifs. This donation spanned jewelry from the French Revolution to 1900, underscoring Vever’s dedication to preserving France’s jewelry heritage

At the peak of World War I, however, Vever chose (or was forced) to dispose of the bulk of his collection, selling some 7996 prints to the Japanese industrial mogul Matsukata Kōjirō, who purchased them sight-unseen based on the collection's reputation. The prints would eventually find their way to the Tokyo National Museum, forming the bulk of that institution's ukiyo-e corpus. Many of Vever's prints also ended up in the national museums of France, donated earlier by Vever himself.

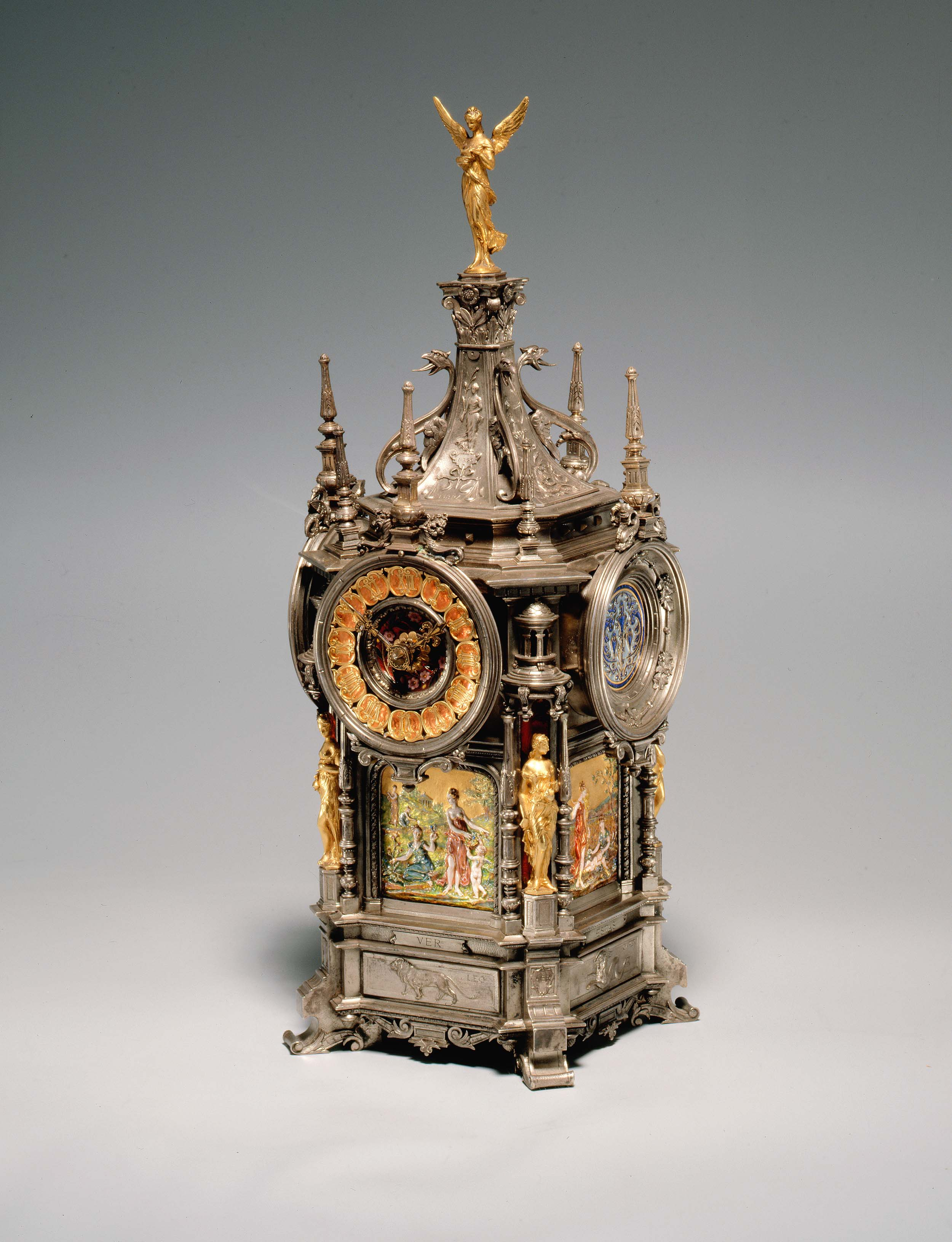
Timepiece by Henri and Paul Vever displayed at the Paris Exposition Universelle of 1889

Although the thousands of pieces that made their way back to Japan via Matsukata included many of the masterpieces of the ukiyo-e movement, Vever had kept many of his best prints for himself and continued to collect after the First World War, acquiring pieces from former rivals Gonse, Haviland, Manzi, Isaac, and Javal as their collections went to the auction houses of Paris. He stopped collecting in the 1930s, and his "legendary" collection disappeared the following decade amid World War II and the German occupation of France, not to reappear until 1974 when Sotheby's announced that the collection would be auctioned. The sale took place in four parts, each in London:

- Part I: 26 March 1974, 412 lots
- Part II: 26 March 1975, 410 lots
- Part III: 24 March 1977, 415 lots
- Final Part: 30 October 1997, 197 lots

Works from the first two parts were soon re-printed, together with 148 prints not sold at those auctions, in a limited-edition (2000-copy) three-volume catalog: Japanese Prints & Drawings from the Vever Collection, by Jack Hillier.

Vever's grandson, François Mautin, competed at the 1928 Winter Olympics in the ice hockey tournament.
