= Henri Bouchot =

French librarian and historian (1849–1906)

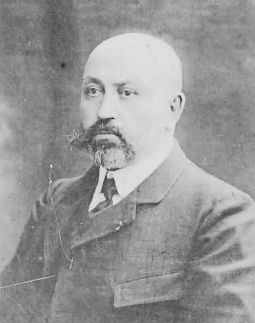
Henri Bouchot (1880s)

Marie François Xavier Henry Bouchot (French pronunciation: [maʁi fʁɑ̃swa ɡzavje ɑ̃ʁi buʃo]; 26 September 1849, Beure - 10 October 1906, Paris) was a French art historian and conservator.

== Biography ==
Born to a modest family, his father died when he was only ten, and they moved to Besançon. He served in the Franco-Prussian War, with the Armée de l'Est. When he was twenty-five, he became a student at the École Nationale des Chartes, where he obtained a diploma as a Archivist-paleographer in 1878, with his thesis on the history of Vitry-le-François.

In 1883, he founded the Revue Franc-comtoise, and began working for the Département des Estampes at the Bibliothèque Nationale de France, under the direction of Henri Delaborde; helping to edit a catalogue, Les Portraits aux crayons des XVIe et XVIIe siècles.

He became an assistant librarian in 1885, and wrote several studies of old prints. That same year, he married Claire Chevalier. They had a son, Jean (1886-1932), a conservator at the Musée de Besançon, and a daughter, Jacqueline, a professor at the École du Louvre and wife of the sculptor, Georges Saupique.

In 1898, he succeeded Georges Duplessis as conservator at the Département des Estampes. Two years later, he was named a Knight in the Legion of Honor, for his role in organizing the Exposition Universelle. Then, in 1904, he was elected to the Académie des Beaux-Arts, where he took Seat #10 in the "Unattached" section.

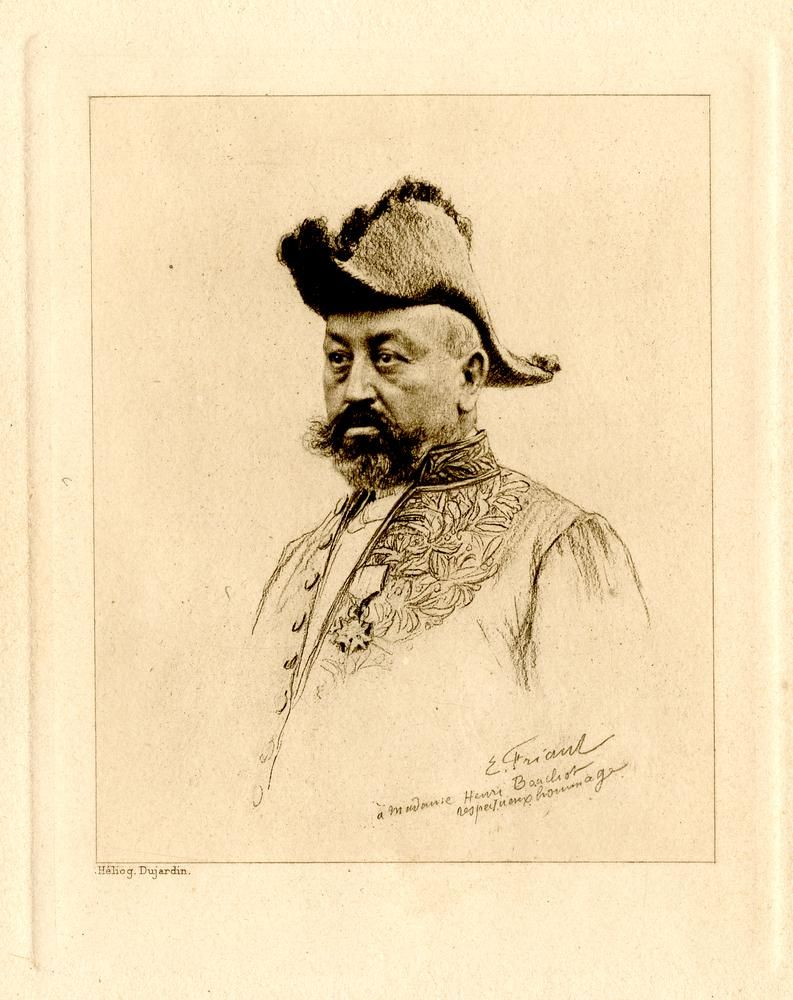
Bouchot in his Legion of Honor uniform, by Paul Dujardin

His death came suddenly. A street in Beure has been named after him. A bust on a pedestal, by Armand Bloch, was dedicated in Besançon in 1907. in a square that bears his name.
