= Charles-Louis Barreswil =

French physiologist and biochemist

Charles-Louis Barreswil (13 December 1817 – 22 November 1870) was a French physiologist and biochemist who was among the first to investigate the process of digestion in humans and also a range of other chemical applications including photographic and printing processes.

Barreswil was born to Madeleine Desiree Cambon and Cyr Magloire Barreswil who worked at the Château de Versailles. Barreswil studied chemistry under Pierre-Jean Robiquet (1780–1840) and Théophile-Jules Pelouze (1807–1867) in Paris. He joined the laboratory headed by Pelouze and collaborated with Claud Bernard (1813–1878) from 1848. Their experiments included studies on the assimilation of nutrients. Their approach was to feed a pure substance and examine if it was also produced in the urine or faeces. They experimented on dogs as well as themselves. They came to the conclusion that the gastric juice was acidic but rejected the possibility of HCl and suggested instead that it was lactic acid. In 1848, they determined that the liver always contained sugar even when an animal was starved. Barreswil also taught chemistry at the École Municipale Turgot and the École Supérieure de Commerce. In 1853, he worked along with Noël-Paymal Lebebours (1807–1873) and Rose-Joseph Lemercier (1803–1887) to develop a photo-lithographic method for etching and printing. He gave up scientific research in 1865 and began to work on social problems, particularly on protection for young workers. He died in Boulogne-sur-Mer.

== Publications ==
- Charles Louis Barreswil & Aimé Girard, Dictionnaire de chimie industrielle (Dictionary of industrial chemistry), 4 vol. : t. 1, 1861, t.2, 1862, t.3, 1863, t.4, 1864.
