= François Mautin =

French ice hockey player

Personal information
- Nationality: French
- Born: 9 May 1907 Paris, France
- Died: 27 October 2003 (aged 96) Paris, France

Sport
- Sport: Ice hockey

François Albert Mautin (9 May 1907 – 27 October 2003) was a French ice hockey player. He competed in the men's tournament at the 1928 Winter Olympics. He was a grandson of the jeweler Henri Vever, with Mautin inheriting his art collection, which was later sold to the Smithsonian Institution for $7 million.
