= Paul-André Lemoisne =

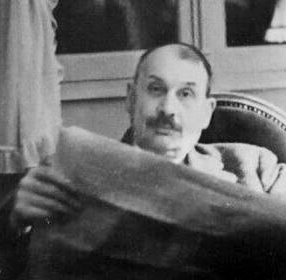
Paul-André Lemoisne (1930s)

Paul-André Lemoisne (7 February 1875, Paris - 19 June 1964, Neuilly-sur-Seine) was a French art historian, librarian, and member of the Institut de France.

== Biography ==
His father was a doctor. He became a student at the École Nationale des Chartes and, in 1901, was awarded a diploma as an archivist-paleographer, for his thesis on François de Vendôme.

Upon leaving the school, he took a position in the Cabinet des Estampes of the Bibliothèque Nationale. In 1904, he was an assistant to his former teacher, Henri Bouchot, for an exhibition at the Pavillon de Marsan. This resulted in his becoming a trainee there. In 1907, he was named a member of the French Art Committee.

He met his future wife, Suzanne, the granddaughter of illustrator Paul Gavarni, at a gallery showing by Henri Rouart.

From 1925 to 1939, he was Chief Curator of the Cabinet, and served two terms as the President of the Association des bibliothécaires de France (1927-1928, and 1931-1933). He was also President of the Société de l'histoire de France, and the Société de l'histoire de l'art français.

In 1945, he was elected to the Académie des Beaux-Arts, where he took Seat #4 in the "Unattached" section; succeeding the Vicomte de Castelnau. His best known publication is a catalogue raisonné of the works of Edgar Degas, in four volumes (1942-1949).
