= Jean Louis Marie Eugène Durieu =

French photographer (1800–1874)

Jean Louis Marie Eugène Durieu (10 December 1800 – 16 May 1874) was an early French amateur nude photographer, primarily known for his early nude photographs of men and women.

A number of his male and female models were also painted by Eugène Delacroix, with whom he was friends.

== Biography ==
Durieu was born in Nîmes, and became known for making studies of nudes for Delacroix.

During his career Durieu was a lawyer. His last job was inspector for education and culture.

In 1849, he went into early retirement and devoted himself to the newly developing technology of photography. In 1853, Durieu worked with Delacroix on a series of photographs of different male and female nude models.

On 15 November 1854, Henri Victor Regnault founded the French Société française de photographie (SFP), one of the earliest photographic societies in the world, and was its president. Regnault wanted to see notable individuals with strong scientific expertise in fields such as chemistry, physics, optics, photographic techniques in positions of the association, on the basis that the scientific component is an important aspect of photography.

Between 1854 and 1855, Durieu played a key role in the organisation of the association; and other notables involved included Olympe Aguado, Hippolyte Bayard, Alexandre Edmond Becquerel, Edmond Fierlants, Jean-Baptiste Louis Gros, and Gustave Le Gray.

Durieu resigned in 1856, after a case of forged documents.

Durieu died in Paris in 1874.

== Gallery ==
Durieu presented his whole set of photographs, calotypes and daguerreotypes made between 1853 and 1856, of male and female nude models to the Société française de photographie in 1857, describing them as "portraits and studies from nature".

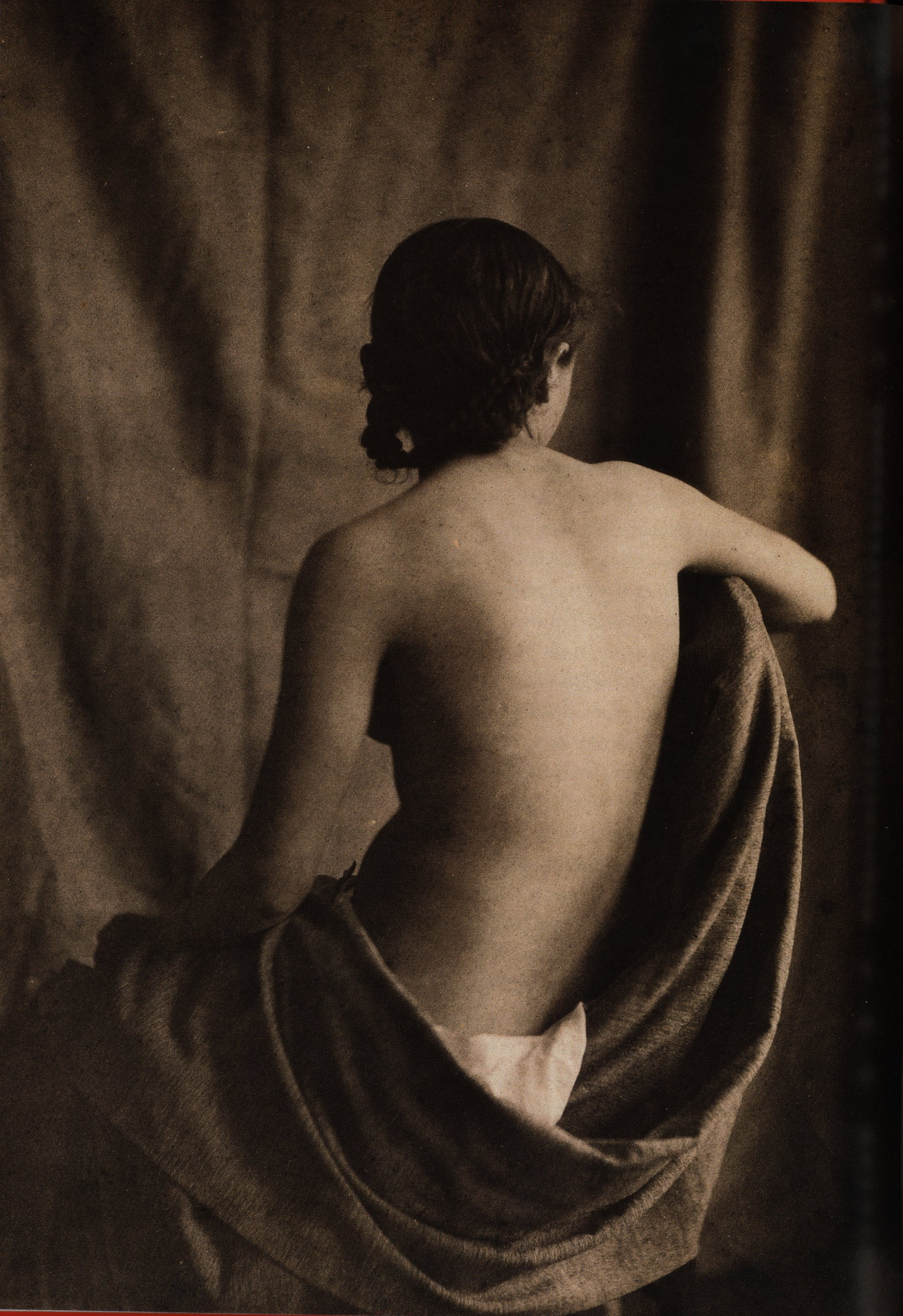

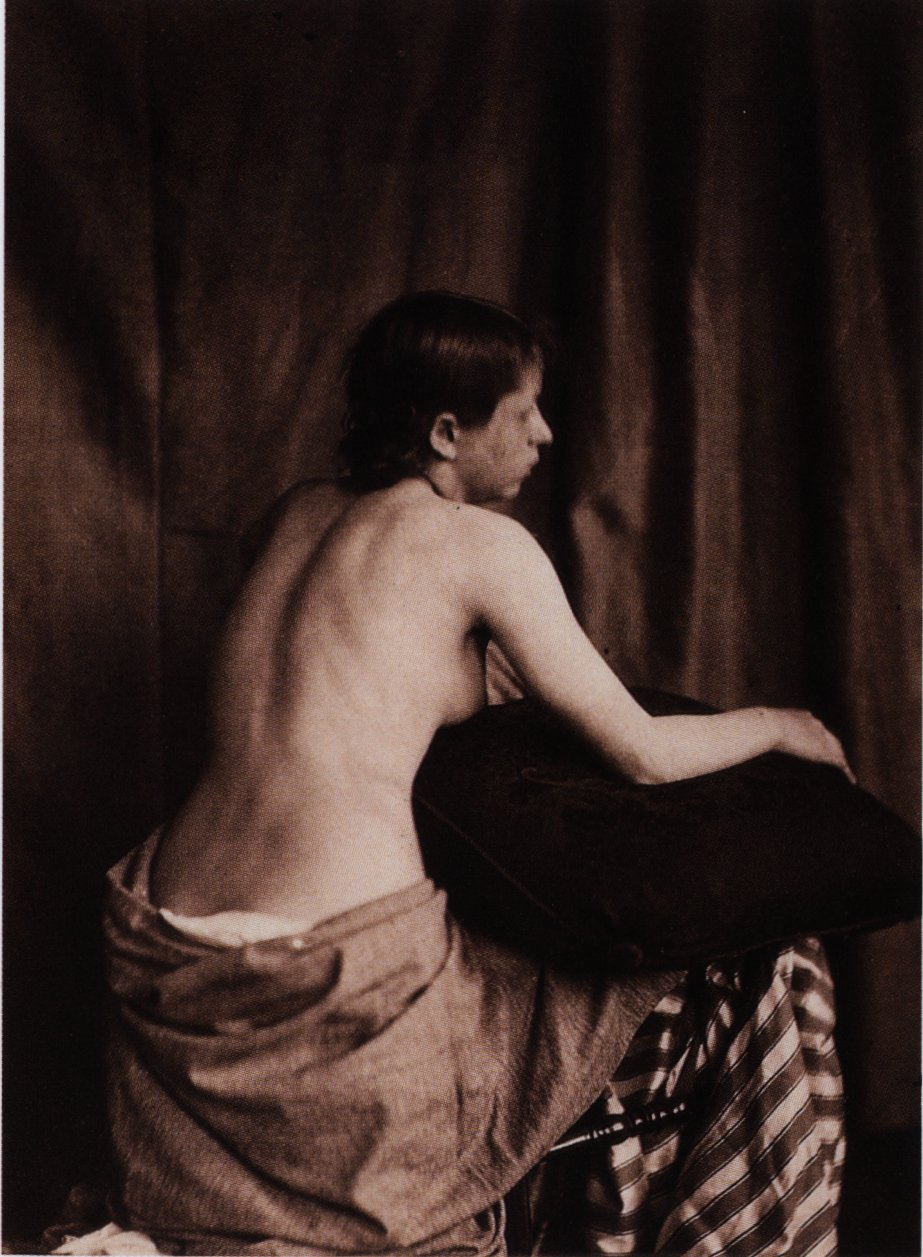

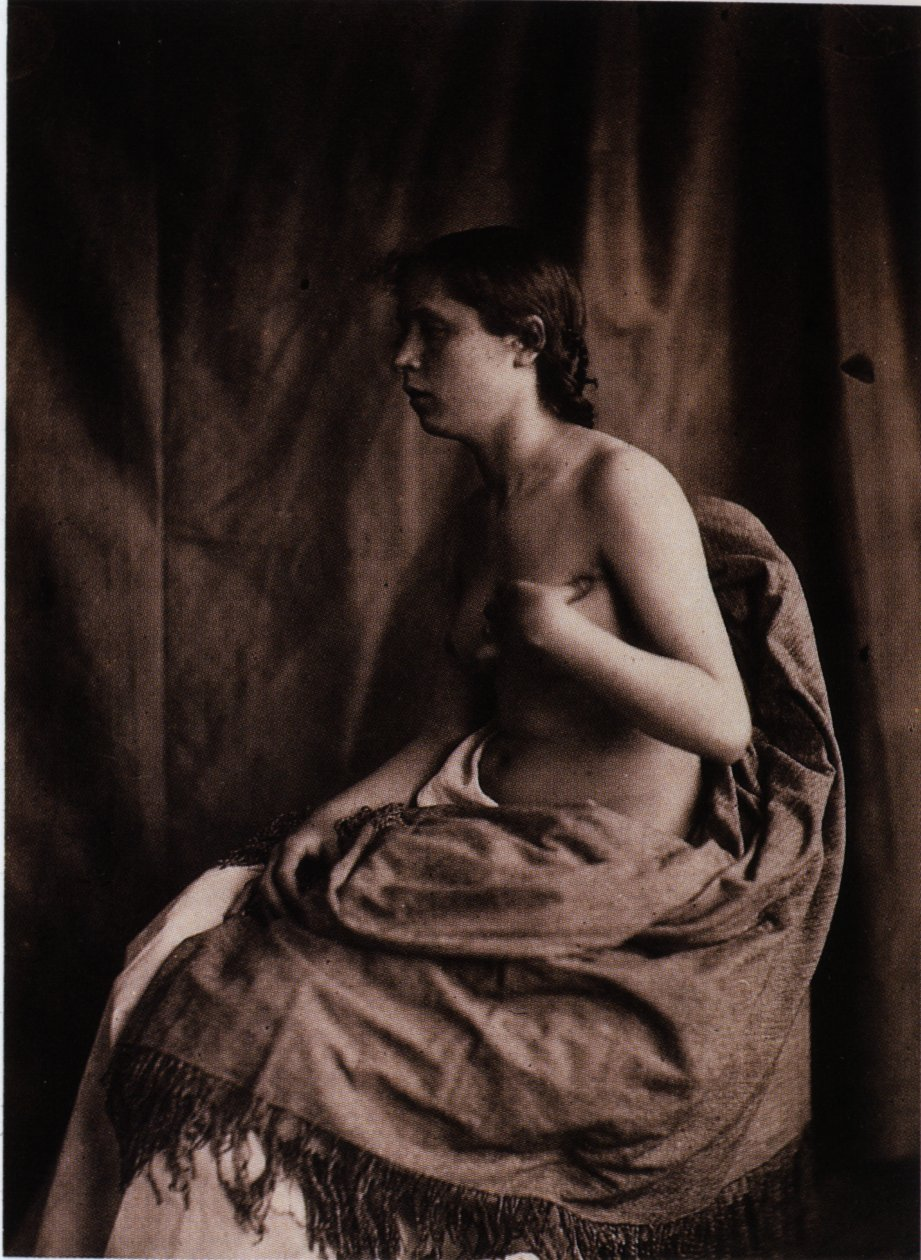

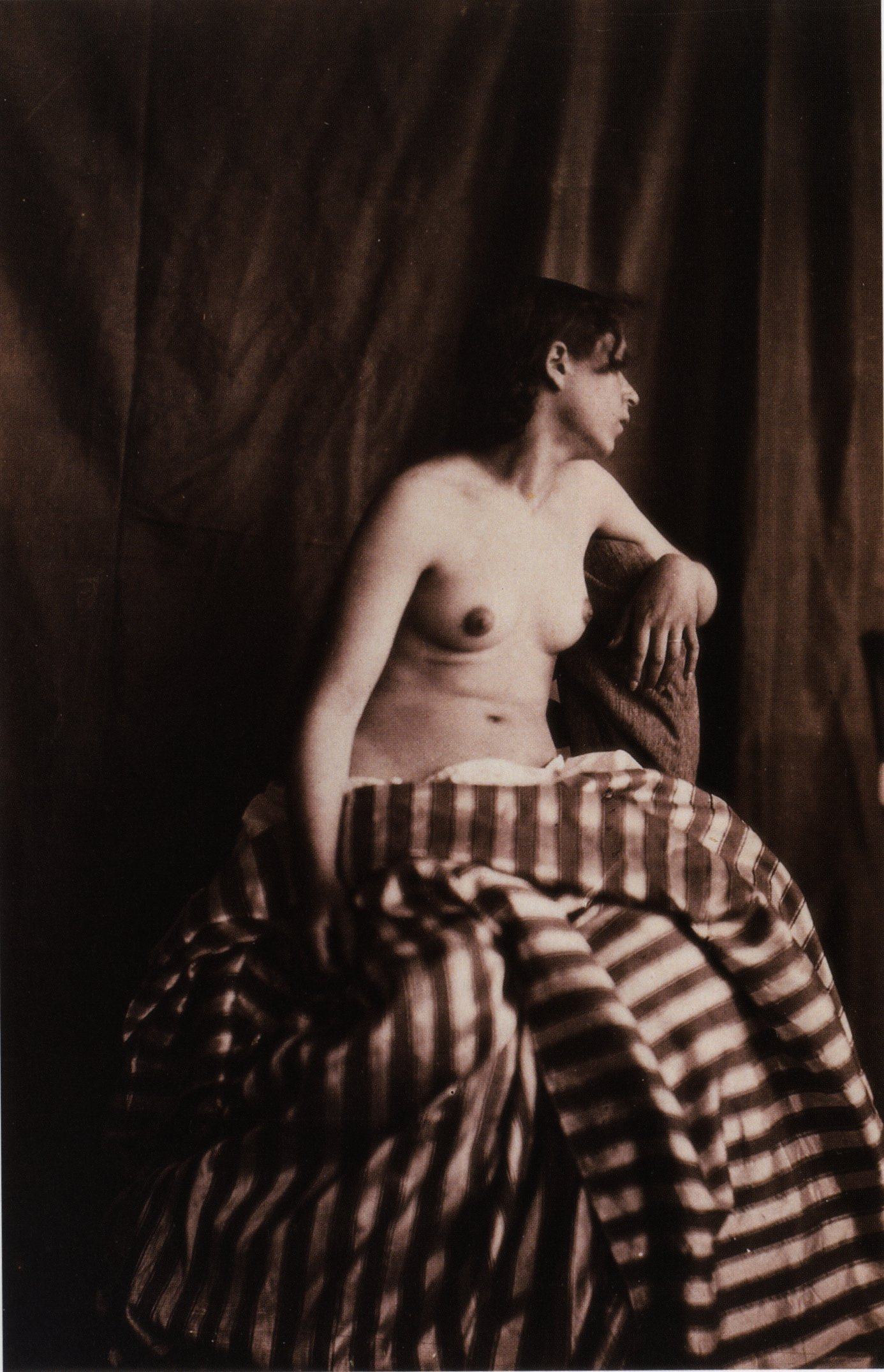
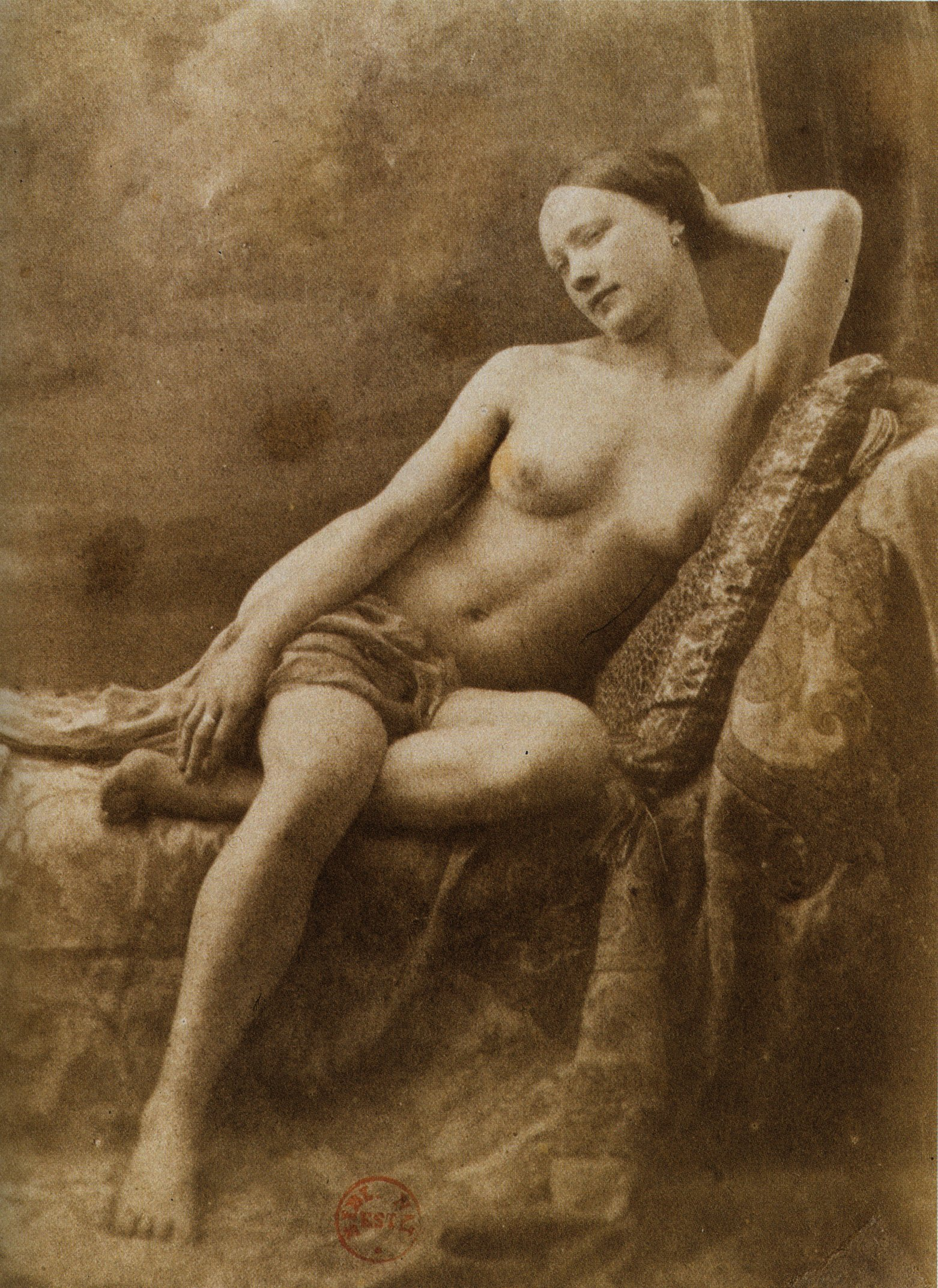

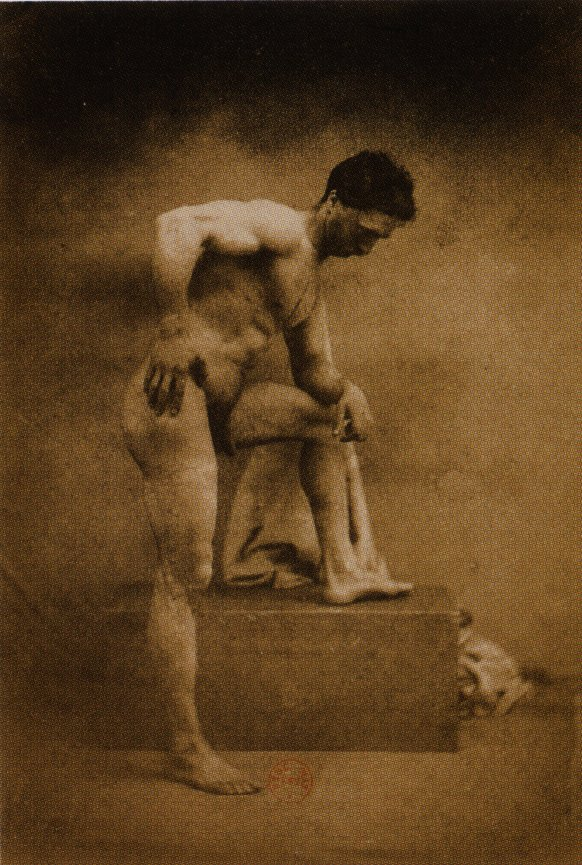

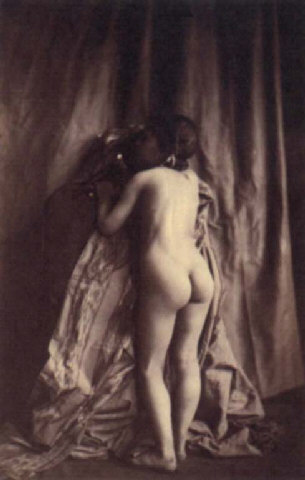

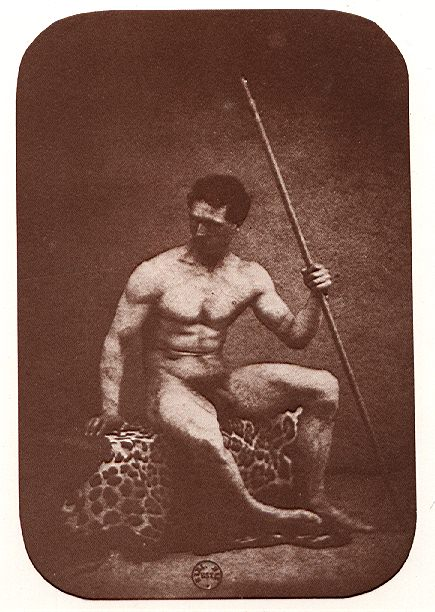

== Collections and exhibitions ==
Durieu's works are found or have been exhibited in a number of galleries, including:

- Getty Center - 2007-2008 Exhibition
- Metropolitan Museum of Art, New York
- Musée d'Orsay, Paris
- Museum of Modern Art, the San Francisco
- National Gallery of Art, Washington
