= Auguste-Adolphe Bertsch =

French photographer and photographic inventor (1813–1871)

Auguste Adolphe Bertsch
- Born: 1813; France
- Died: 1871 (aged 57–58); Paris, France
- Occupations: Photographer, optical instrument maker
- Organizations: Société Française de Photographie
- Known for: Microphotography; photographic process innovation; Chambre Automatique
- Notable work: Études d’Histoire Naturelle au Microscope (1857)

Auguste-Adolphe Bertsch (1813–1871) was a French photographer, optical instrument maker, and early pioneer of microphotography. Active during the formative decades of photography, he contributed to improvements in photographic processes, camera design, and scientific imaging, and was a founding member of the Société Française de Photographie.

== Early life ==
Auguste Adolphe Bertsch was born in France in 1813. Little is known about his early life or formal education, but he trained in optics and became involved in photographic experimentation during the rapid development of photography in the mid-19th century.

== Career ==
=== Photographic work and innovations ===
By the early 1850s, Bertsch was actively engaged in photographic research, particularly in the application of photography to microscopic subjects. He worked extensively with the wet collodion process and, in 1851, introduced improvements that increased its sensitivity, enabling shorter exposure times.

In the same period, Bertsch developed a disc-shutter mechanism and published technical notes on the use of rapid collodion. His work contributed to the refinement of photographic equipment at a time when the medium was transitioning from experimental practice to broader scientific and artistic use.

Bertsch was also an early practitioner of photomicrography, producing photographs of insects, crystalline structures, and other natural subjects viewed through the microscope. These images are among the earliest examples of photography applied systematically to microscopic scientific observation.

=== Camera design ===
Around 1860, Bertsch designed a miniature camera known as the Chambre Automatique. Using wet collodion plates, the camera was notable for its compact size and fixed-focus lens, making it one of the earliest examples of a sub-miniature photographic camera.

=== Société Française de Photographie ===
In 1854, Bertsch was among the founding members of the Société Française de Photographie (SFP), one of the earliest photographic societies in the world. He later served on its governing board from 1858 until 1870, reflecting his standing within the French photographic community.

=== Studio work and publications ===
In 1857, Bertsch established a photographic studio in Paris in partnership with Camille d’Arnaud. In the same year, he published Études d’Histoire Naturelle au Microscope, a collection of photomicrographs printed as salted paper prints from wet-plate collodion negatives. The publication is considered rare, with only a small number of copies known to survive.

== Later life and death ==
Bertsch retired from active photographic work in 1863. He died in 1871 during the events of the Paris Commune, a period of civil unrest following the Franco-Prussian War.

== Legacy ==
Bertsch's photographs and microphotographs are held in museum and institutional collections, including the Metropolitan Museum of Art. His work is recognised for its role in the early development of scientific photography and photographic technology.

== Selected works ==
- Études d’Histoire Naturelle au Microscope (1857)
- Photomicrographs of insects and crystalline forms (1850s)
- Chambre Automatique camera (c. 1860)
