= International Congress of Photography =

Photography conference

International Congress of Photography Congrès international de photographie
- Genre: Photography conference
- Location: Varies
- Country: Varies
- Founded: 1889; 137 years ago, Paris, France

The International Congress of Photography (French: Congrès international de photographie) or the International Photographic Congress, which was later renamed as The International Congress of Scientific and Applied Photography, was an international conference dedicated to the study and advancement of photography. Active from 1889, it focused on both scientific research and practical applications within the field.

== History ==
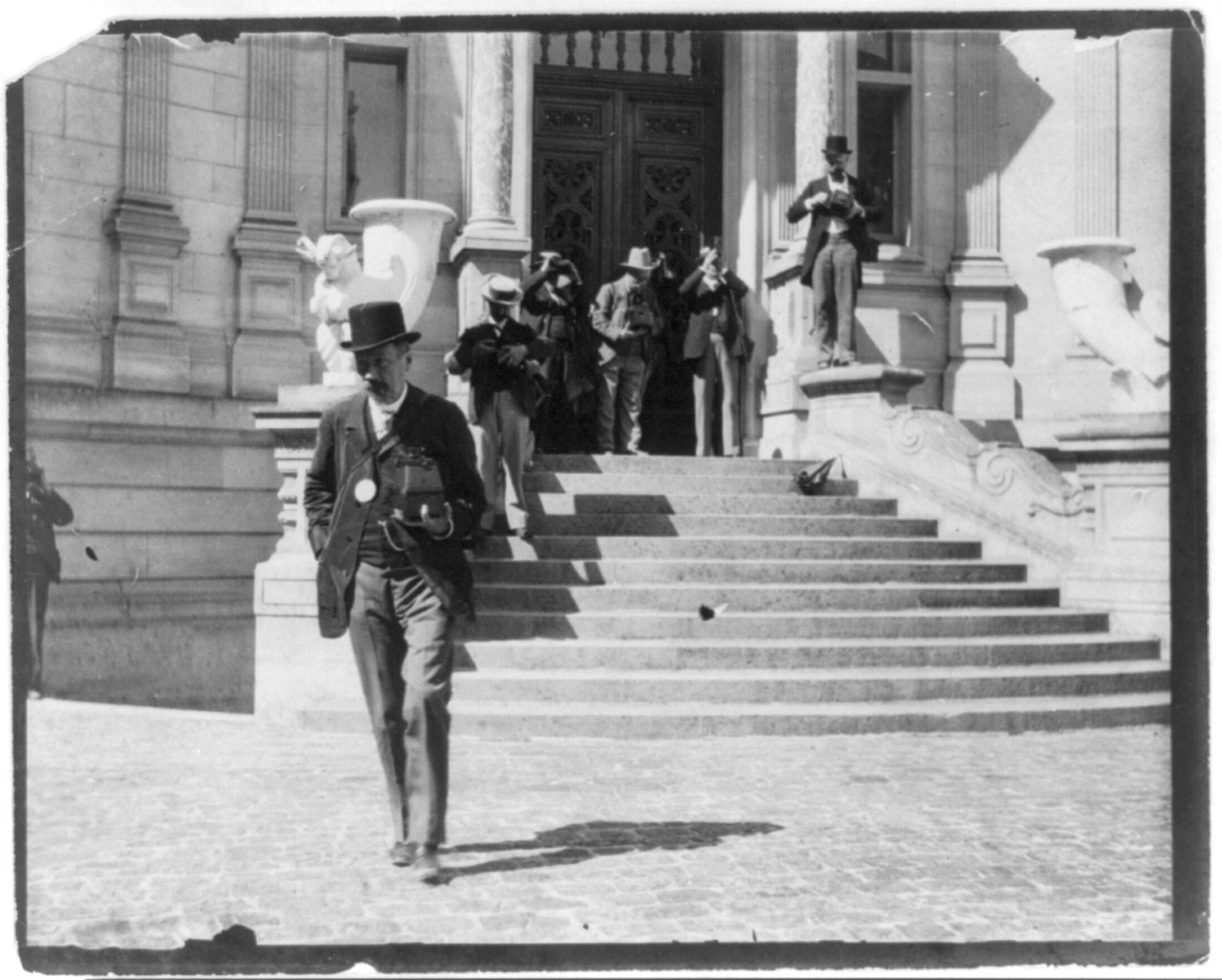
The 1900 International Congress of Photography in Paris, by Frances Benjamin Johnston

The International Congress of Photography was established to address significant questions pertinent to photographers. It was first suggested by the jury of the Brussels Photographic Exhibition in 1885. At an 1887 meeting of the French Photography Society (French: Société française de photographie), M. Stebbing proposed that the Society should organize a Photographic Congress to coincide with the Exposition Universelle of 1889 in Paris. The proposition was referred to the Committee of Administration and eventually arranged under the auspices of the French government. A ministerial order dated August 2, 1887, officially established a congress and series of conferences. Subsequently, on July 16, 1888, the minister of commerce and industry, also serving as the commissioner general for the 1889 Exhibition, issued another resolution nominating the Committee of Organization for the International Photographic Congress. Jules Janssen, director of the Meudon Observatory, was appointed president of the committee, with astronomer Charles Wolf and chemist Alphonse Davanne as vice presidents. Davanne was the vice president of the Société française de photographie. Sosthène Pector was appointed as the secretary and treasurer. The committee had more than 20 members.

=== First International Congress ===
From August 6 to 17, 1889, the first International Congress of Photography was held in Paris, France.

Ten questions were picked for the first congress's agenda, which was organized in conjunction with the 1889 Paris Exposition. The Congress reviewed and made suggestions on the practical standard for the unit of light, focal length measurement, diaphragm effects, shutter timing, attachment methods, plate sizes, formula expression, process naming, customs procedures for sensitive materials, and artistic property protection in photography.

The 1889 International Congress of Photography set standard dimensions for certain parts of photographic equipment, such as the screws of the feet of darkrooms, the lens mounts, or their boards, and for certain objects used in photography, such as sensitive plates and papers.

At the close of the event, the Congress recommended that the next International Congress be hosted by Belgium in 1890, forming a committee to manage the preparations.

=== Second International Congress ===
The second International Photographic Congress was set for Brussels, Belgium in August 1891.

The Belgian organizing committee was composed of members of the Association Belge de Photographie, formerly one of the leading photographic organizations in Belgium. The committee included J. Maes as president, Alexandre de Blochouse as vice president, Charles Puttemans as the secretary general, and Aimé Rutot as a committee member.

Beginning on the 23rd of August, the opening session of the International Congress took place at the Brussels Town Hall. Similar to 1889, another large congress of renowned photographers spent several hours each day over multiple days meticulously discussing a range of practical issues and proposing standards, among other recommendations.

=== Third International Congress ===
In 1900, the third International Congress of Photography was held in Paris from July 23 to 28. The congress continued the work of the previous international congresses held at Paris in 1889 and at Brussels in 1891. S. Pector returned as the secretary general of the Congress.

=== Fourth International Congress ===
In 1905, the fourth International Congress of Photography took place in Liège, Belgium.

General Hippolyte Sebert, on behalf of the Permanent International Committee, presented a report on the "Standardization of Screws Entering into the Construction of Photographic Apparatus".

=== Fifth International Congress ===
Brussels, Belgium hosted the fifth International Congress of Photography in 1910, coinciding with the Universal Exhibition.

The support of leading societies from Belgium and France, plus various local committees, was secured. For eight shillings (ten francs), members of the Congress were granted all benefits, including a report copy when it was published.

=== Sixth International Congress ===
The sixth International Photographic Congress was held in Paris, France, from June 29 to July 4, 1925.

Emanuel Goldberg notably exhibited extremely fine-lined graticules at the Congress.

The delegates of The Royal Photographic Society of Great Britain had invited the Congress to hold its next session in England in 1928.

=== Seventh International Congress ===
From July 9 to 14, 1928, London hosted the seventh International Congress of Photography.

The proceedings of the 1928 International Congress of Photography were published by W. Heffer & Sons Ltd in Cambridge, England.

=== Eighth International Congress ===
By the eighth convention, the name of the congress was changed to "The International Congress of Scientific and Applied Photography".

The eighth International Congress of Scientific and Applied Photography took place in Dresden, Germany, from August 3 to 8 in 1931, with the final day's events moved to Berlin. The agenda of the session was concerning sensitometric standardization and motion-picture standardization. It was attended by Canadian photographer Margaret Watkins.

=== Ninth International Congress ===
The ninth International Congress was held in the rooms of the Société française de photographie in Paris from July 7 to 13, 1935.

== Congress locations and dates ==
Number	Year	Location	Notes
1st	1889	Paris, France	
2nd	1891	Brussels, Belgium	
3rd	1900	Paris, France	
4th	1905	Liège, Belgium	
5th	1910	Brussels, Belgium	
6th	1925	Paris, France	
7th	1928	London, England	
8th	1931	Dresden, Germany	
9th	1935	Paris, France	
