= Michel Poivert =

Professor of history of art and photography (born 1965)

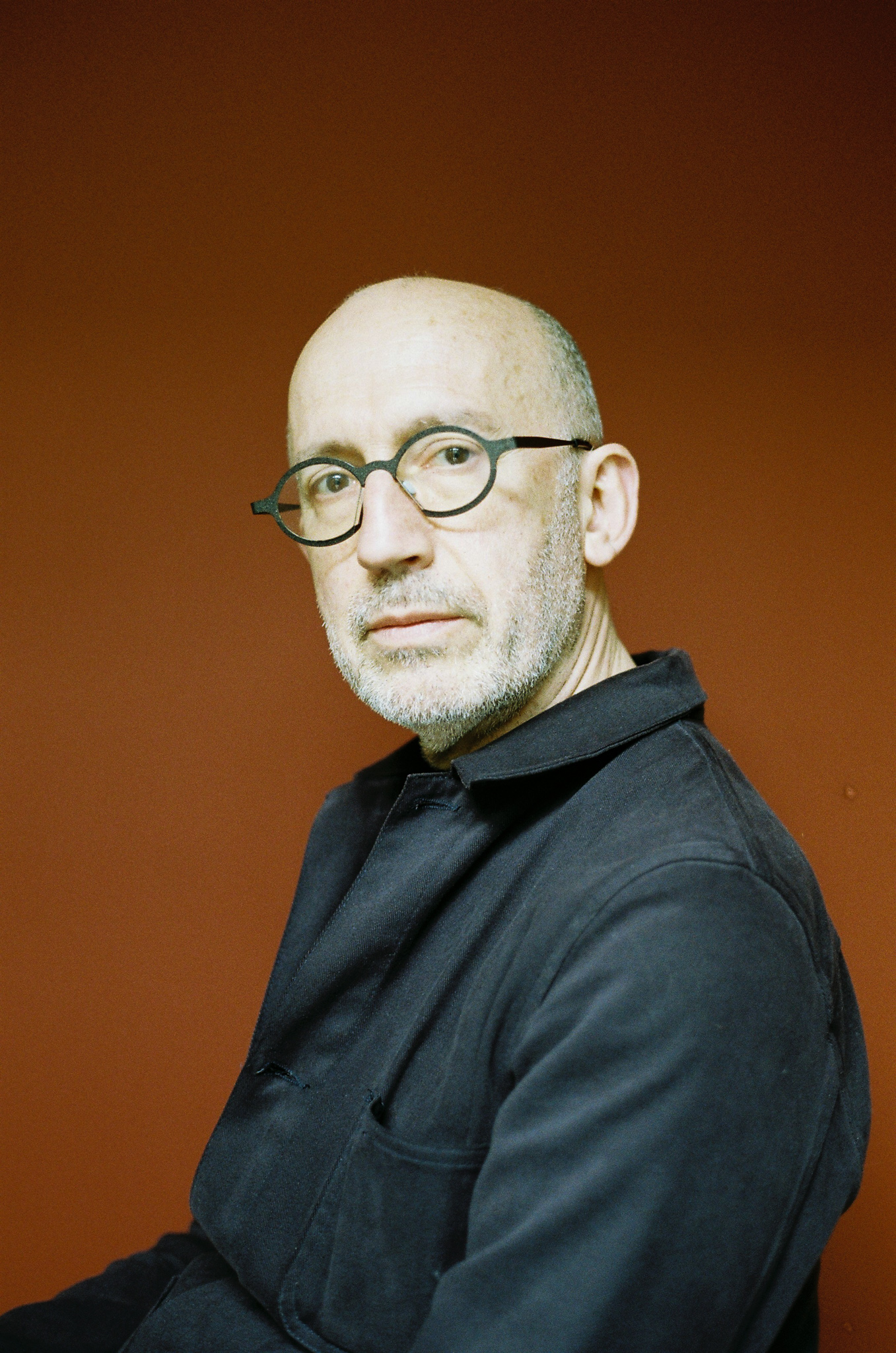

Michel Poivert (born 1965) is a professor of the history of contemporary art and photography at the Sorbonne. He has taken a special interest in pictorialism, the subject of his doctorate thesis. From 1995 to 2010, he was president of Société française de photographie, the French Photography Society. In 2018, he founded the International College of Photography (CIP). In 2020, he was awarded Officier des Arts et des Lettres.

== Career ==
Student at the school of the Louvre Museum, Poivert holds a Ph.D. in Art History about pictorialism in France from La Sorbonne University (Paris 1 Panthéon-Sorbonne University) in 1992, headed by José Voyelle. In 2002, he received his post-doctoral Ph.D. (Habilitation) on the relation between avant-gardes and photography in the 20th century. Since 2006, he has been a professor at La Sorbonne University.

From 2009 to 2012, he was the director of the school of Art History and Geography at La Sorbonne University. He was also the director of the Art History doctoral school from 2013 to 2018. Between 2010 and 2019, he was co-director of the research M.A. in History of Photography at the school of the Louvre Museum. He has directed and is directing several Ph.D. in the History of Photography.

He was a member of the editorial committees for the Revue de l’art and Etudes photographiques. He was also a member of the scientific committees for A Revista Visualidades é uma publicação semestral do Programa de Pós-graduação em Arte e Cultura Visual da Universidade Federal de Goiás, Rivista di studi di fotografia, Firenze university press, the journal Transbordeur Photographie Histoire Société, Université de Genève/Université de Lausanne, and the journal Photographica, edited by the Société française de photographie and the French Ministry of Culture.

Poivert serves in several extra-academic roles. He is a member of the administrative committees of the Jeu de Paume, the Conseil National des Arts Plastiques (2015–2018), the Centre photographique Ile-de-France and the Société française de photographie. He is part of scientific committees such as the Conseil Scientifique de la Médiathèque de l’architecture et du Patrimoine, the French Ministry of Culture, the Jacques-Henri Lartigue Foundation, the Gilles Caron Foundation and the Scientific Board of Lieven Gevaert Center for Photography. Furthermore, he is an administrator for the Neuflize-OBC Corporate Foundation for the arts, and a member of the acquisition committee of Neuflize-OBC.

In 1992, Poivert helped the Société française de photographie (SFP) recover from near-bankruptcy and became its president in 1995. In 2004, he organized the exhibition "L'Utopie photographique", clearly testifying to the association's new lease of life on the occasion of its 150th anniversary. He has been editor of SFP's magazine, Etudes photographiques, and together with Clément Chéroux, he has participated in building a collection of biographies of contemporary photographers, also published by the SFP. In addition to his teaching and research assignments, he has been effective in promoting the younger generation of French photographers.

== Works ==
- La Photographie pictorialiste en France, Bibliothèque nationale-Hoëbeke, collection “ Le siècle d’or de la photographie ”, Paris, 1992, 31 cm, 108 p., 80 ill.
- Robert Demachy, Nathan, collection “ Photo-Poche ”, Paris, 1997, 19 cm, 75 p., 64 ill.
- Hippolyte Bayard, Nathan, collection “ Photo-Poche ”, Paris, 2001, 19 cm, 75 p., 64 ill.
- La photographie contemporaine, Flammarion, collection “ contemporain ”, Paris, 2002, 26 cm, 192 p., 140 ill.
- La photographie contemporaine, Flammarion, collection “ contemporain ”, Paris,. 2010, réed augmentée, 240 p., 200 ill., 2010.
- La Fotografia contemporanea, Einaudi, trad. Camilla Testi, 2011, 240 p.
- L’Utopie photographique, regard sur la collection de la Société française de photographie, (dir) Paris, Le Point du Jour Éditeur, 2005, 29 cm, 223 p., 130 planches.
- L’image au service de la révolution – Photographie, surréalisme, politique, Paris, Le Point du Jour Éditeur, 2006, 122 p., 30 ill.
- L’Art de la photographie des origines à nos jours, (dir) avec Gunthert, André et al, Citadelles et Mazenod, 2007, 650 p., 1000 ill., réed. 2016.
- Soria della Fotografia, ed. italienne, (dir). Avec Gunthert, André et al., Electa, 2008.
- El Arte de la Fotografia, de los origines a la actualidad, ed. espagnole (dir) Avec Gunthert, André et al., Lunwerg Editores 2009.
- L’Art de la photographie des origines à nos jours, (dir) avec Gunthert, André, Shèyǐng yìshù, édition chinoise China Photo, 2015.
- Patrick Tosani – les corps photographiqes, avec Tiberghien, Gilles A., Flammarion, 2011.
- Gilles Caron, le conflit intérieur, Photosynthèses, Arles, 2012, 415 p., 300 ill.,
- Histoires de la Photographie, avec Julie Jones, Jeu de Paume/Le Point du Jour éditeur, 2014, 120 p., 97 ill.
- Man Ray photographe, bilingue fr./angl., Yellow Korner édition, Paris, 2014, 192 p., 110 ill.
- L'Expérience photographique (dir), Publications de la Sorbonne, 2014, 272 p.
- Brève histoire de la photograhie - essai, Hazan, 2015, 200 p.
- Les Peintres photographes, Citadelles et Mazenod, Paris, 2017.
- Gilles Caron 1968, Flammarion, Paris, 2018.
- La Photographie contemporaine, édition revue et augmentée, Flammarion, 2018.
- Philippe Chancel – Datazone, Photosynthèse, Arles, 2019.
- 50 ans de photographie française, de 1970 à nos jours, Textuel, 2019.
- La Région humaine – 20 ans de photographie documentaire, avec Gilles Verneret, ed. Loco, Paris 2021.
- La Fotografia contemporanea, Einaudi, Nuova Edizione ampliata, trad. Camilla Testi, 2021, 240 p.
- Paul Nadar – Payram, dialogue photographique sur la route de la soie, avec Mathilde Falguière, ed. Le Bec en l’Air, 2021.

== Exhibitions ==
Michel Poivert has organized a number of photo exhibitions:

- « Le Salon de photographie, le pictorialisme en Europe et aux Etats-Unis », musée Rodin, 1993.
- « Un monde non-objectif en photographie », galerie Thessa Hérold, Paris, 2003.
- « L’utopie photographique, 150 ans de la Société française de photographie », Maison Européenne de la photographie, Paris, 2004.
- « La Région humaine », Musée d’art contemporain de Lyon, 2006.
- « L’Événement, les images comme acteur de l’histoire », Jeu de Paume, Paris, 2016.
- « La Subversion des image, surréalisme, photographie, film », Centre Georges Pompidou, 2009-2010.
- « Nadar, la norme et la caprice », Château de Tours, Jeu de Paume Hors-les-murs, 2010; Multimedia Art Museum, Moscou, 2015.
- « Gilles Caron (1939-1970) le conflit intérieur » au musée de l’Elysée à Lausanne (2012), au musée de la photographie de Charleroi (2013) et au Jeu de Paume hors-les-Murs (Château de Tours, 2014), et en 2015 à Clermont-Ferrand.
- « Caron 68 », Hôtel de ville de Paris, 2018.
- « Laura Henno Rédemption », Rencontre internationale de la Photo, Arles, 2018.
- « Nadar convention & caprice », Musée Marubi, Skoder, Albanie, 2018.
- « Philippe Chancel, Datazone », Eglise des frères Prêcheurs, Arles, 2019.
- « Laura Henno - Radival Devotion », Institut pour la photographie des Hauts de France, 2019.
- « 50 ans de photographie française », Domaine national du Palais Royal Paris, mars -mai 2020.
