= Auguste Anastasi =

French painter and lithographer (1820-1889)

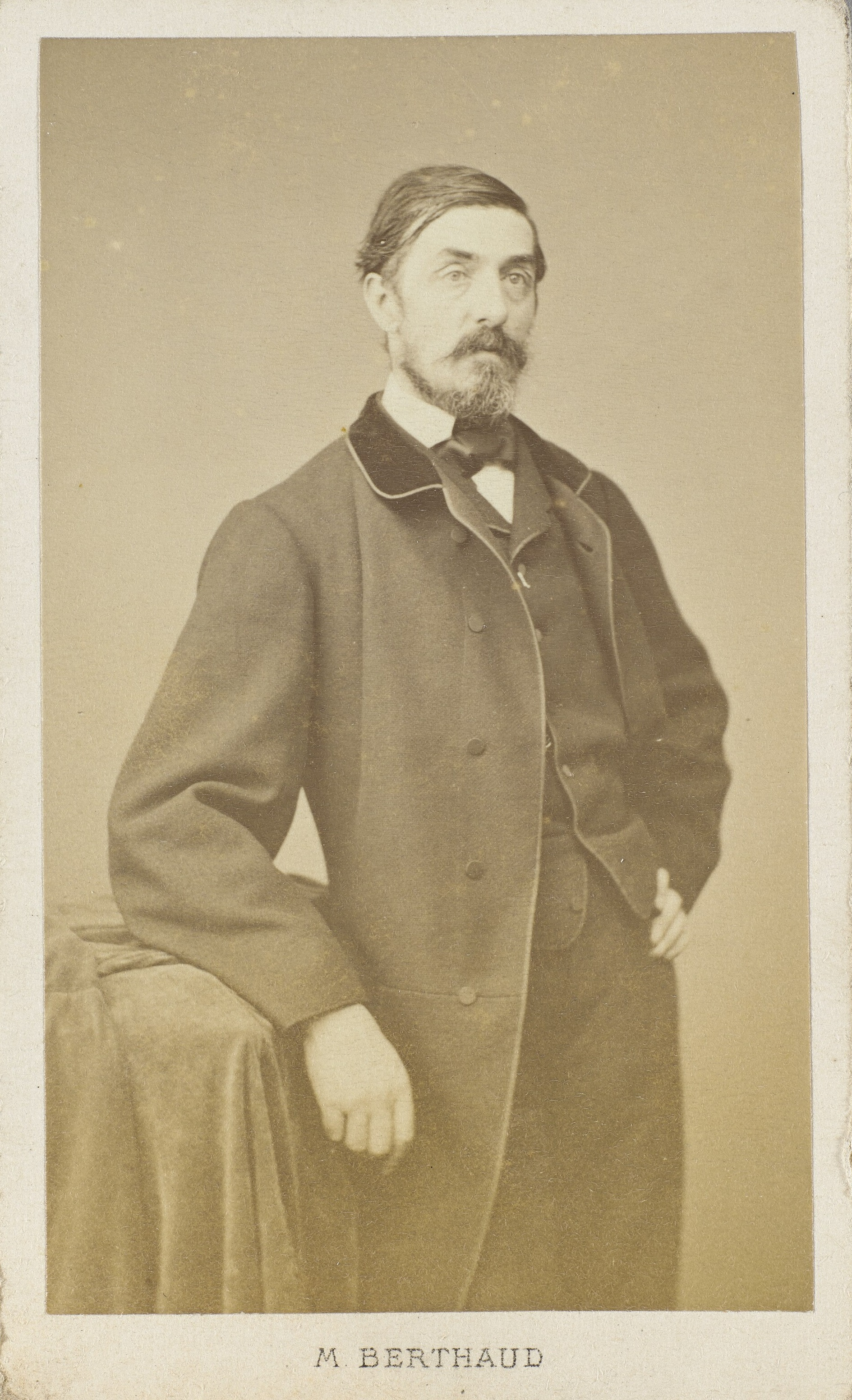
- Portrait of Auguste Anastasi by Michel Berthaud (1866)
- Born: Auguste-Paul-Charles Anastasi; 15 November 1820; Paris, France
- Died: 15 March 1889 (aged 68); Paris, France
- Resting place: Père Lachaise Cemetery
- Occupations: Painter; Lithographer
- Known for: Landscape painting
- Father: Paul Joseph Anastasi
- Relatives: Nicolas Leblanc (grandfather)
- Awards: Knight of the Legion of Honour (1868)

Signature
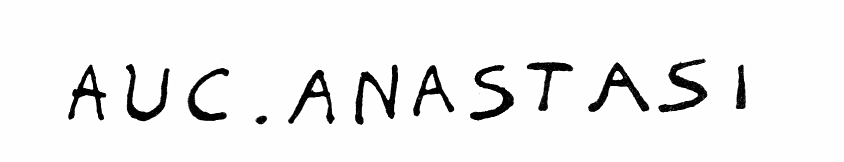

Auguste Anastasi (15 November 1820 – 15 March 1889) was a French landscape painter and lithographer who became a notable figure in French art for his Barbizon-style landscapes and lithographic work, which earned him medals at the Paris Salon, despite his later battle with blindness.

== Early life and education ==
Auguste-Paul-Charles Anastasi was born on 15 November 1820 in Paris, France. His father, Paul Joseph Anastasi, an Italian artist born in Rome with Greek roots, came to Paris from Italy in 1806. He later became completely blind in 1813 at 32 years old and was admitted to the hospice at Quinze-Vingts National Ophthalmology Hospital. His mother was the daughter of Nicolas Leblanc, making Auguste his grandson.

Anastasi was a pupil of French painters Eugène Delacroix, Paul Delaroche, and Jean-Baptiste-Camille Corot. Delacroix introduced him to half-tones, while Corot inspired his success in landscape art in the style of the Barbizon School.

== Career ==
He began to enter his work at the Paris Salon and was awarded with many medals. Anastasi earned a second-class medal for painting in 1848. In 1849, he turned his efforts to lithography, notably creating illustrations for L'Artiste. By creating many lithographs, he helped publicize the work of Jules Dupré and other 1830s artists. He won a third-class medal for lithography in 1852. In 1855, he received an honorable mention at France's first Universal Exhibition in Paris.

Working in the Paris area, Anastasi's artistic endeavors took him to Normandy, Italy, Holland, and Brittany. Throughout his career, he drew inspiration from the Forest of Fontainebleau, his Parisian surroundings, Holland's landscapes, Rome's monuments, and Italy's hills.

Inspired by the works of Ruysdael, Hobbema, and Van der Neer, Auguste Anastasi sought to study Holland in the late 1850s. He fully embraced the techniques of the great masters of the Netherlands. He produced a lithograph titled Bank of the Meuse at Zwindrecht (Holland) which was exhibited at the Salon of 1857.

In 1861, Théophile Gautier compared him to Van der Neer, noting his mastery of Dutch views despite his Italian name, and predicted his works would match Van der Neer's value in 50 years.

Anastasi, suffering from a prolonged illness, spent a year in Italy in 1862 to restore his health. While a sale fetched 760 francs for a single painting and included drawings, many works were sold through his network of acquaintances. He sold 15 paintings and 25 drawings and aquatints to cover the travel expense.

His travels to Rome, Naples, and rural Italy resulted in Terrace of the Villa Pamphili, among other paintings. First exhibited at the Salon of 1864, the painting is now held at the Musée du Luxembourg.

At the Salon of 1865, he showcased The Roman Forum, Setting Sun, The Banks of the Tiber, and two Roman views. He earned another second-class medal in the painting category. In the Salon of 1866, Anastasi exhibited Terrace of a Convent at Rome, A View at Tivoli, and a watercolor of an Italian villa. In the Salon of 1867, The Coliseum and a Brook in Autumn. In the Salon of 1868, A Wash House near Naples, A Bit of the Village of Leidschendam in Holland, and a watercolor of the Winter Garden of the Princess Mathilde.

He travelled to Douarnenez, Brittany in 1868. On 12 April 1868, Anastasi was distinguished as a Knight of the Legion of Honour.

He was credited with the illustrations for Casimir Chevalier's book titled Naples, Vesuvius, and Pompeii: Travel Sketches (French: Naples, le Vésuve et Pompéi: croquis de voyage) published in 1871 in Naples.

Like his father, he had struggled with failing eyesight for ten years, hindering his ability to paint. His vision problems caused him to paint irregularly, though his output was greater in his early years. Théophile Gautier described it as "He saw black butterflies dancing before his eyes, like pieces of burnt paper carried away by the wind". Anastasi went completely blind in July 1870, at the age of 50. He was mentioned in the journals of the Goncourt brothers on several occasions. Recalling his distress, the Goncourts noted, "When he became blind, the idea that, having no more money, he would be obliged to return there (hospice), he had seriously intended to kill himself".

His artist friends grouped together to organize a sale for his benefit. The auction catalog included works by Corot, N. Diaz, Jules Dupré, E. Isabey, E. Fromentin, Daubigny, Rosa Bonheur, Cabanel, Bida, Gérôme, Lami, de Curzon, Eugène Lavieille, Stevens, Bonnat, and many more. With 200 artworks gathered by 1870, the war and Siege of Paris postponed progress for a few years. The sale took place in 1872 at the Parisian Hôtel Drouot. The sale generated more than 120,000 francs after covering all expenses. He expressed his gratitude to the artists in a letter from the Municipal Health Center of Paris, dated 7 February 1872.

Once he became completely blind, he retired to the neighborhood of Batignolles in the 17th arrondissement of Paris. In 1884, despite his blindness, he wrote a memoir on his grandfather Nicolas Leblanc, based on family papers.

Many of the landscape painter's works are in provincial museums throughout France, notably Nantes, Rennes, and Quimper.

== Death ==
Auguste Anastasi died on 15 March 1889 in Paris, France. His death was announced in The Art Journal that year. After his passing, Anastasi left 100,000 francs in State annuities to the Académie des Beaux-Arts to establish yearly assistance for artists in financial difficulty.

== Works ==
- Bank of the Meuse at Zwindrecht (Holland) (1857)
- Terrace at the Villa Pamfili, at Rome (1864)
- The Roman Forum (1865)
- Setting Sun (1865)
- The Banks of the Tiber (1865)
- Two Roman views in water colors (1865)
- Terrace of a Convent at Rome A View at Tivoli (1866)
- A watercolor of an Italian villa (1866)
- The Coliseum (1867)
- Brook in Autumn (1867)
- A Wash House near Naples (1868)
- A Bit of the Village of Leidschendam in Holland (1868)
- A watercolor of the Winter Garden of the Princess Mathilde (1868)

== Gallery ==
Works by Auguste Anastasi

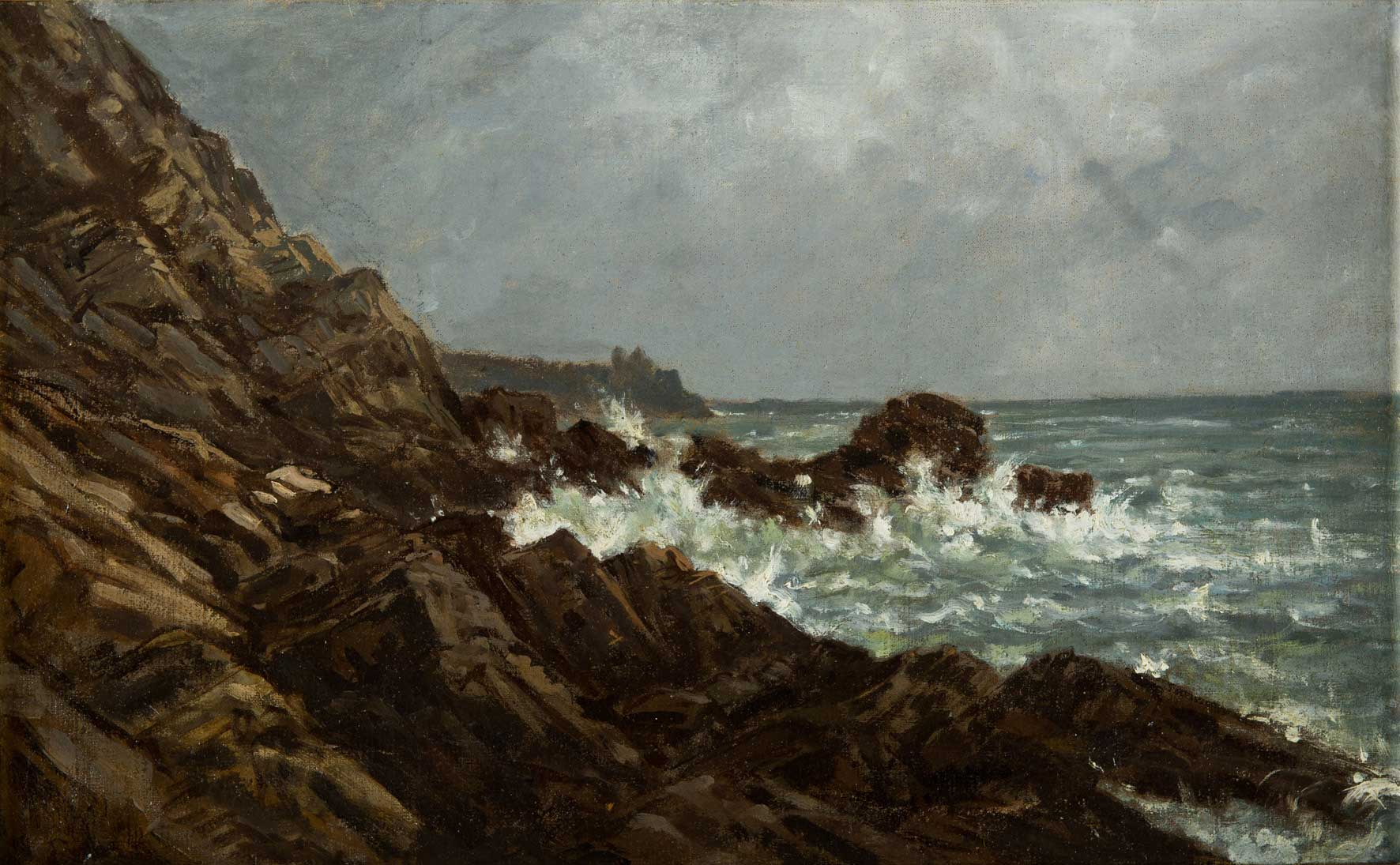
La Côte près de Pont-Aven

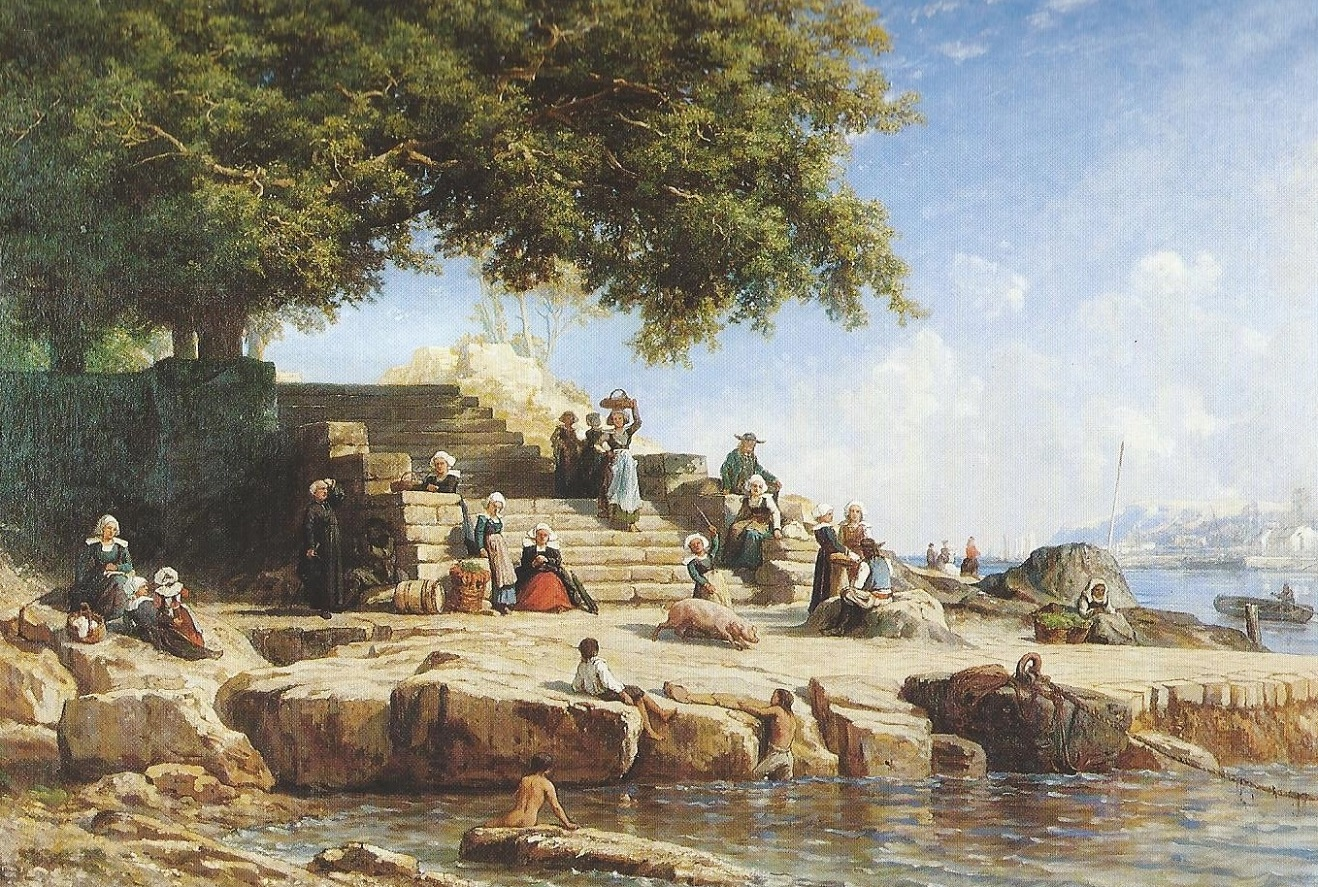
Le passage du bac à Tréboul

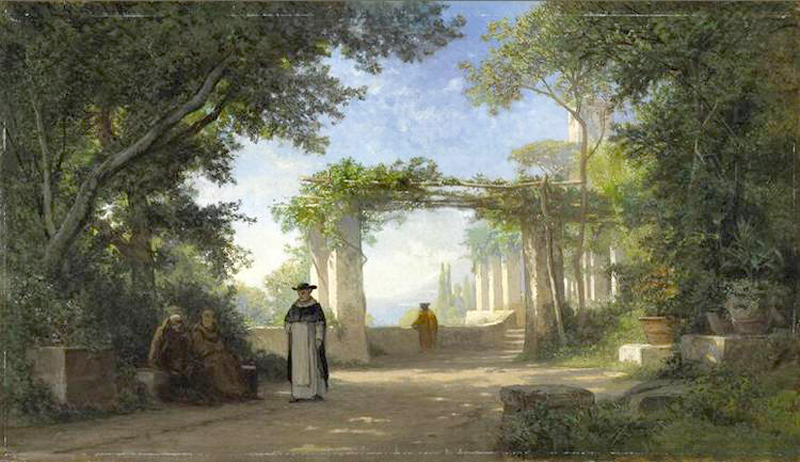
Terrasse de couvent en Italie

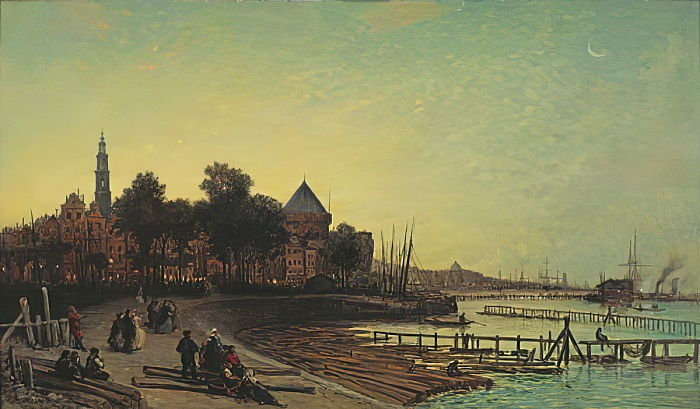
Amsterdam le soir
