= Anastasiou =

Anastasiou (Greek: Αναστασίου) is a Greek surname. Notable people with the surname include:

- Aglaia Anastasiou (born 1986), Greek synchronized swimmer
- Dora Anastasiou, Cypriot beauty queen
- Giannis Anastasiou (born 1973), Greek football player and manager
- Haris Anastasiou, Cypriot singer and dancer, represented Cyprus in the Eurovision Song Contest 1990
- Konstadinos Anastasiou (born 1986), Greek sprinter
- Yannis Anastasiou (born 1973), Greek footballer
