= Benjamin Anastas =

American novelist (born 1969)

- Born: 1969 (age 56–57); Gloucester, Massachusetts, U.S.
- Education: Iowa Writers' Workshop
- Occupations: Novelist; memoirist; journalist; book reviewer
- Website: www.benjaminanastas.com

Benjamin Anastas (born 1969) is an American novelist, memoirist, journalist and book reviewer born in Gloucester, Massachusetts. He teaches literature and writing at Bennington College and is on the faculty of the Bennington Writing Seminars MFA program.

== Writing career ==
=== Fiction ===
Anastas started publishing his short fiction while still a graduate student at the Iowa Writers' Workshop. His first novel, An Underachiever's Diary, is a comic send-up of the meritocracy narrated by the underachieving half of a set of identical twins, and is set in Cambridge, Massachusetts. On the jacket of Anastas's second book, The Faithful Narrative of a Pastor's Disappearance: A Novel, Daniel Handler called it "hands down, the best novel of the year". It concerns the disappearance of the pastor of a liberal Congregational church in suburban Boston and was a New York Times Notable Book.

=== Journalism and other writings ===
Anastas's fiction, criticism, essays and journalism have appeared in Story, GQ, The Paris Review, The New Republic online, The New York Observer, The New York Times Book Review, The Washington Post, and Bookforum. In 2005, The Yale Review published his novella Versace Enthroned with Saints: Margaret, Jerome, Alex and the Angel Donatella and later awarded it the Smart Family Foundation Prize for Fiction.

Anastas has published articles on the Mayan Calendar 2012 hoax in The New York Times Magazine, the prosperity gospel in Harper's Magazine and a short piece about his father's nude portrait on Granta's website. His essay "The Foul Reign of Emerson's 'Self Reliance'", also from The New York Times Magazine, was selected for The Best American Essays 2012, guest edited by David Brooks. His essay on the Gullah language folktale ″Buh Black Snake Git Ketch″ appeared in the Spring, 2020 issue of The Oxford American.

=== Memoir ===
His memoir, Too Good To Be True, was published in 2012. The title is taken from a sign that the author was made to wear around his neck by a childhood therapist. It tells the story of his stalled career as a writer, the end of his marriage, and his attempts to rebuild his life again. Anastas published the book with Amazon's fledgling publishing imprint in New York City and numerous bookstores have refused to stock it. Giles Harvey, writing in The New Yorker, groups Too Good to Be True in a category he calls the "failure memoir" and cites F. Scott Fitzgerald's The Crack-Up essays as an influence.

== Works ==
- An Underachiever's Diary, Dial Press, 1998 ISBN 9780385343046
- The Faithful Narrative of a Pastor's Disappearance, FSG, 2001 ISBN 0312420684
- Am Fuß des Gebirgs, Jung und Jung Verlag, Wien, 2005 ISBN 9783902144904
- Too Good to Be True, New Harvest, October 16, 2012, ISBN 9780547913995
