= Aimé Girard =

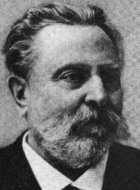
Aimé Girard (1830-1898)

Alfred Claude Aimé Girard (22 December 1831 – 12 April 1898) was a French chemist and agronomist who was a professor at the Conservatoire des Arts et Métiers.

== Biography ==
He was a member of the Académie d'Agriculture, the Académie des sciences (1894-1898) and the Comité des travaux historiques et scientifiques (1897-1898, resident member).

He wrote many publications throughout his lifetime on various topics from the fabrication of paper to the cultivation of industrial potatoes. (All published between 1861-1898)

He was a member of the board of directors of the Société française de photographie in 1863 and had been a member of that society from 1855.

He died at 67 years old and was buried in the renowned Père Lachaise cemetery.

== Selected writings ==
- Recherches sur la composition des raisins des principaux cépages de France, 1895 (Research on grape composition involving the principal grapes of France).
- Mémoire sur l'hydro-cellulose et ses dérivés, 1881 (Memoirs on hydro-cellulose and its derivatives).
- Recherches sur la culture de la pomme de terre industrielle, 1889 ( Research on the cultivation of industrial potatoes.)
- Introduction au Dictionnaire de chimie industrielle, 1861 (Introduction to the dictionary of industrial chemistry).
- Papier et papeterie, 1873 (Paper and stationery).
- Composition chimique et valeur alimentaire des diverses parties du grain de froment, 1884 (Chemical composition and nutritive value involving different parts of wheat grain).
- Recherches sur le développement progressif de la grappe de raisin, 1898. (Research on the gradual development of the grape cluster.)
