= Paul Dujardin (engraver) =

French engraver and photographer

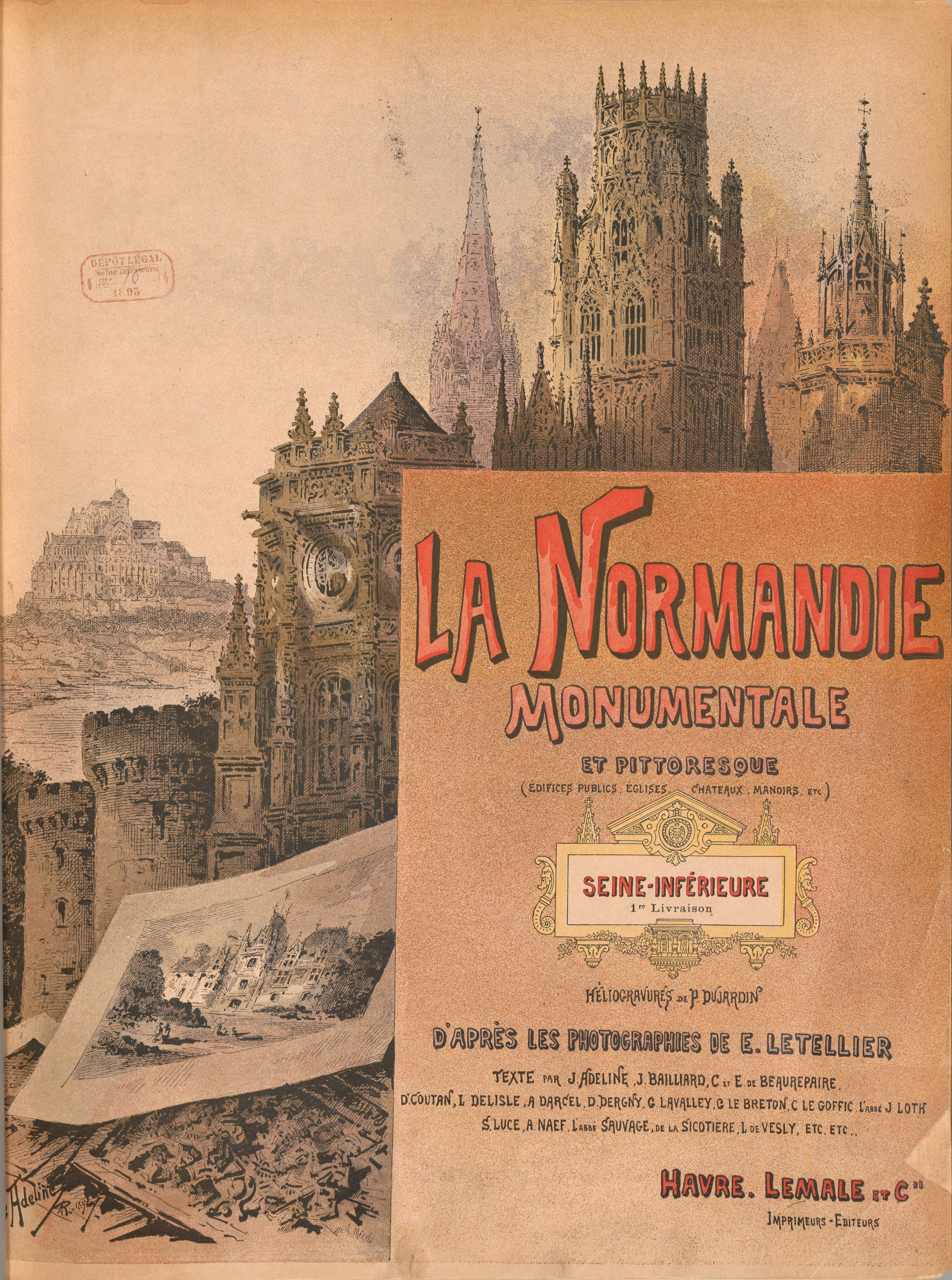
La Normandie monumentale..., cover design by Jules Adeline; engraved by Dujardin

Paul Rodolphe Joseph Dujardin (French pronunciation: [pɔl ʁɔdɔlf ʒozɛf dyʒaʁdɛ̃]; 13 June 1843 in Lille – 7 November 1913 in Paris) was a French engraver and photographer.

== Biography ==
Son of Pierre-Antoine Dujardin, a doctor, he moved to Paris in 1875 to join his brother, Gustave Alexandre, who owned a photography studio. He specialized in plates, produced by rotogravure, and done in intaglio; taken from photographs.

He participated in the Exposition Universelle of 1878, where he presented earthenware, fabrics, and niellowork; made with a rotogravure process of his own devising. Later that year, he was named a Knight in the Legion of Honor. In 1879, he became a member of the Société française de photographie.

His store was on the Rue Vavin, with a branch on the Rue Notre-Dame-des-Champs. He was also involved in making electrical accumulators and, together with his brothers, created "P. R. J. Dujardin et Cie". In 1890, he rented a turbine power plant on the Risle in Pont-Authou. His brother, Albert Désiré, was a builder of steam engines, and President of the Société française de photogravure, in 1900.

== Publications ==
- La Normandie monumentale et pittoresque, édifices publics, églises, châteaux, manoirs, etc., photographs by Émile-André Letellier and others, rotogravures by Paul Dujardin. Éditions Lemasle et Cie, Le Havre, 1893-1899, five volumes : Seine-Inférieure (1893), Calvados (1895), Eure (1896), Orne (1896) and Manche (1899)
