= Maurizio Anastasi =

Italian footballer

Personal information
- Date of birth: 15 January 1977 (age 49)
- Place of birth: Riposto, Italy
- Height: 6 ft 0 in (1.83 m)
- Position: Midfielder

Senior career*
| Years | Team | Apps | (Gls) |
| 1996–1998 | Catania | 1 | (0) |
| 2002–2004 | Acireale | 39 | (2) |
| 2004–2006 | Catania | 43 | (1) |
| 2007–2008 | Cesena | 20 | (0) |
| 2007–2008 | → Avellino (loan) | 27 | (0) |
| 2008–2010 | Ancona | 8 | (0) |
- * Club domestic league appearances and goals

Maurizio Anastasi is a former Italian footballer who plays midfielder.

He previously played for Calcio Catania and Avellino. In June he was signed by A.C. Ancona from relegated Serie B team Cesena.

He also played at Eccellenza level from 1998 to 2001 and Serie D at 2001–02.
