= Louis Désiré Blanquart-Evrard =

French photographer (1802–1872)

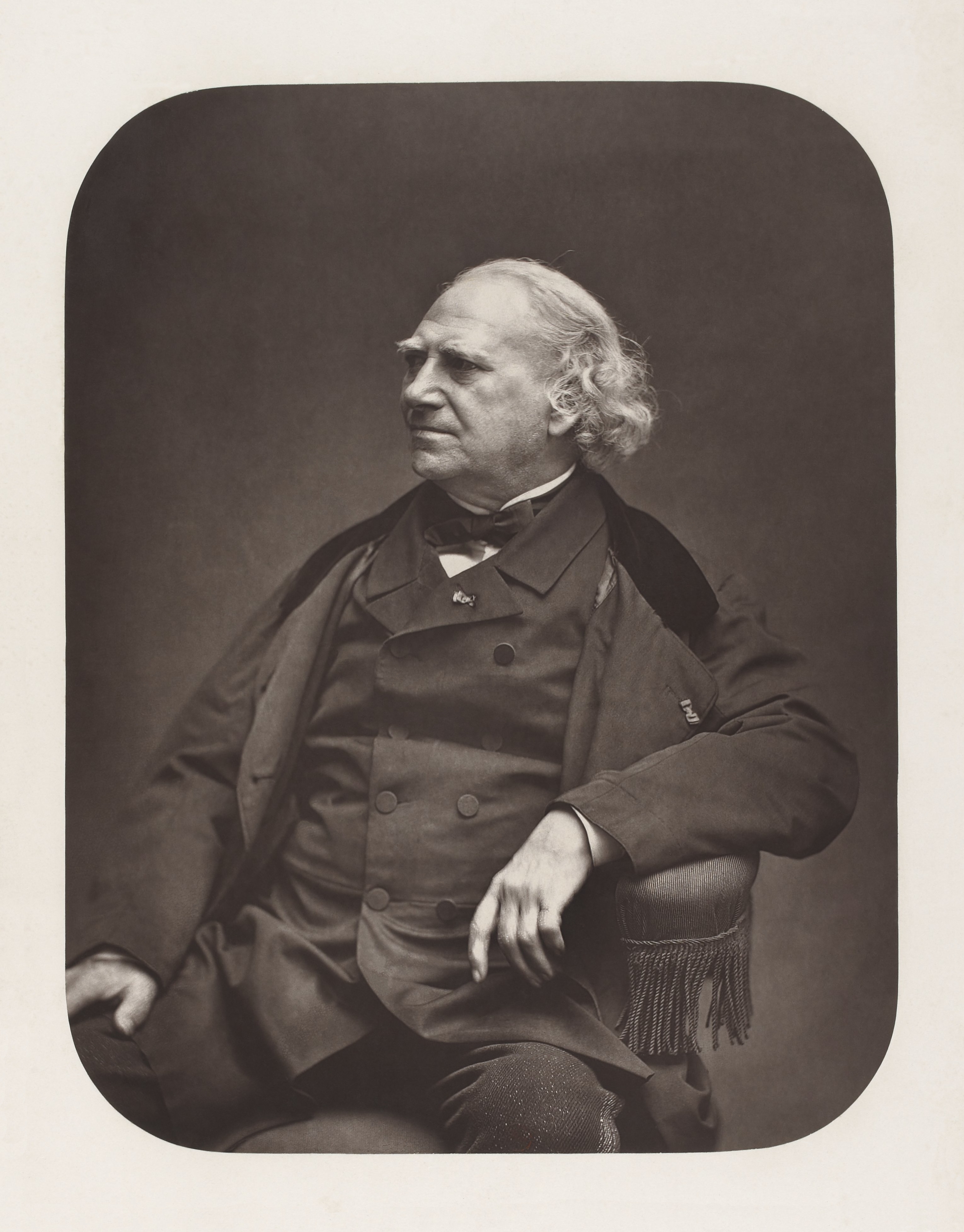
- Blanquart-Evrard in 1869
- Born: 2 August 1802; Lille, France
- Died: 28 April 1872 (aged 69); Lille, France
- Known for: Albumen printing

Louis Désiré Blanquart-Evrard (2 August 1802 – 28 April 1872) was a French inventor, photographer and photo publisher. Being a cloth merchant by trade, in the 1840s he developed interest in photography and focused on technical and economical issues of mass production of photo prints.

== Biography ==
He was born and raised in Lille where he studied chemistry with Charles Frédéric Kuhlmann and miniature painting on porcelain. After Louis Daguerre solved the problem of long exposure time and introduced the daguerreotype, a practical photographic process, to the general public in 1839, Blanquart-Evrard developed interest in photography. He studied the calotype, salt-print negative process, and in 1847 became the first person to publish on negative/positive paper photo process in France. He developed a method of bathing the paper in solutions of potassium iodide and silver nitrate rather than brushing these chemical baths on the surface. In January 1847, he presented his research on stabilizing the photo prints by floating them in the silver solution to the French Academy of Sciences.

== Imprimerie Photographique ==
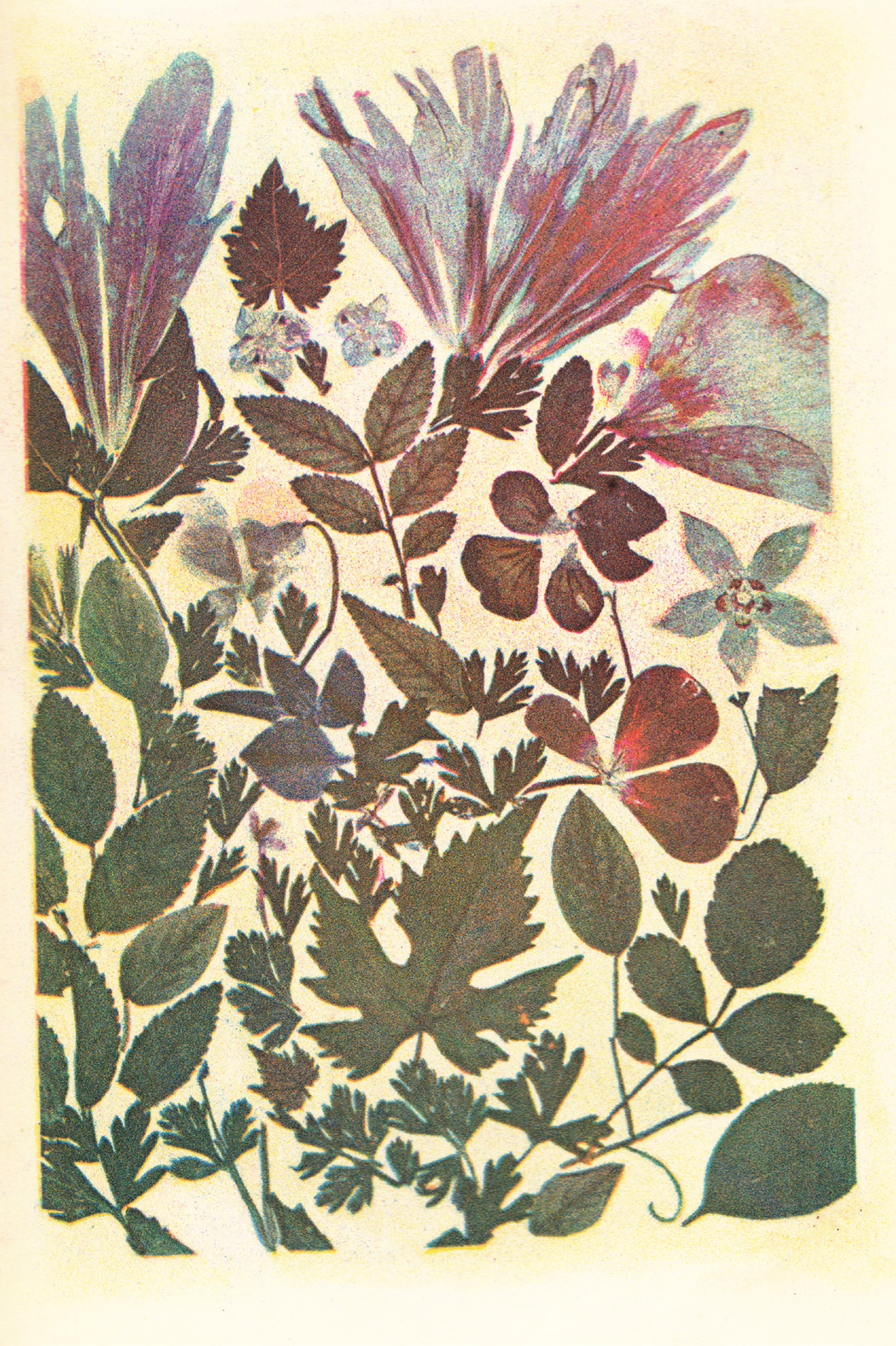
Three-color carbon print of botanical specimens by Blanquart-Evrard, 1871.

In 1850, he developed and introduced the albumen paper printing technique, which became the staple process of the soon to be popular carte de visite type of photo prints. In September 1851 in Lille, France, with Hippolyte Fockedey, he started the Imprimerie Photographique de Lille, which was the first large scale printing company to employ a large number of employees. Blanquart-Évrard introduced to public the work of many pioneering European photographers, such as Édouard Loydreau (1820–1905), Charles Marville (1813–1879), Ernest Benecke (1817–1894), Thomas Sutton (1819–1875), and Maxime Du Camp (1822–1894). In the 1850s he became known for publishing John Stewart's views of the Pyrenees and Auguste Saltzmann's views of Jerusalem. However, the calotype process that he adopted and improved had the disadvantage of leaving a blank white sky and dark foreground, which led to artist manipulating and using multiple negatives to add clouds to the sky and make the foreground more distinct. The problem with these manipulations was that often the clouds were taken in the morning and the foreground was taken in the afternoon. Also, due to technology deficiency, photo prints were fading with time and Blanquart-Evrard's business venture had to close in 1855, losing in competition with lithographs.

Towards the end of his life, Blanquart-Evrard collaborated in color printing with Louis Ducos Du Hauron. A three-color carbon print of botanical specimens produced by Blanquart-Evrard in 1871 has survived.

== Recognition ==
In 1860s, Blanquart-Evrard published several influential essays and books, including, On the intervention of art in photography and La photographie: ses origines, ses progrès, ses transformations where he described the first three decades of the progress of photography and formulated important for the future development of photography as a fine art theoretical and aesthetic ideas. He is now considered as a major figure of the 1850s, a golden decade in the development of photography.
