= Société française de photographie =

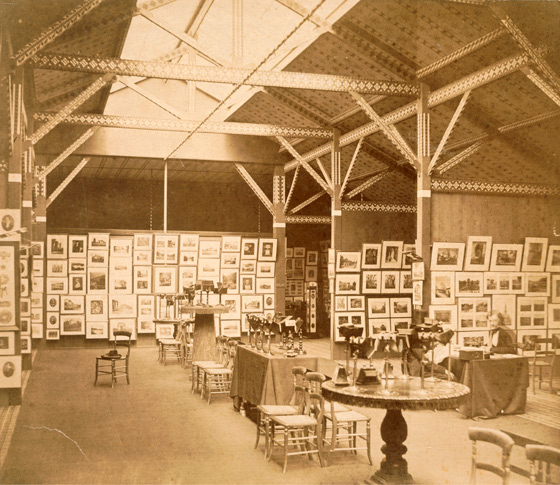
Joint exhibition of the Société française de photographie and The Photographic Society of London, South Kensington Museum, 1858

The Société française de photographie (SFP) is an association, founded on 15 November 1854, devoted to the history of photography. It has a large collection of photographs and old cameras.

Among the founding members were Olympe Aguado, Hippolyte Bayard, Alexandre Edmond Becquerel, Eugène Durieu, Edmond Fierlants, Jean-Baptiste Louis Gros, Gustave Le Gray and Henri Victor Regnault, Auguste-Adolphe Bertsch. Henri Victor Regnault was the first president. Louise Leghait was the first woman member.

== History ==
The Société française de photographie, founded on 15 November 1854, was based on the short-lived Société héliographique (1851) but differed in that it was less elitist and more forward-looking. Some accounts mistakenly link the two organizations more closely, referring simply to a change in the name with a view to giving the SFP the status of the world's oldest photography organization. A careful analysis of the Société héliographique describes in detail how the initial enthusiasm for the organization quickly disappeared, resulting in the discontinuation of its activities. The SFP was thus established without any formal connection to the Société héliographique.

The objectives of the SFP were therefore far more commercially oriented and more concerned with future developments, like the Académie des sciences. Its members—ambitious amateurs, artists, businessmen and scientists—had regular meetings at an established venue, with a written agenda. The objectives were published in a programme and there were regular bulletins. For the remainder of the 19th century, the association was exclusively concerned with improvements to photography. There were regular exhibitions of the members' images, as well as conferences and presentations addressing new techniques, their artistic potential and the latest innovations. The SFP considered itself both an academy of photography and a library of archives. The photographs exhibited were properly archived, together with many comments from the members.

From the beginning of the 20th century, the SFP set itself the task of safeguarding historic works. Today, it acts as a research centre on the history and development of photography. Since 1997, it has published the twice-yearly journal Études photographiques with articles on prominent photographers and on the history of photography. The association has a valuable historic collection consisting of some 10,000 images and 50,000 negatives, including 5,000 autochromes. There is also a specialist library with 8,000 books and over 650 journals.

The first president of the SFP was Henri Victor Regnault. Its current president is Paul-Louis Roubert, an art historian specializing in photography who has actively contributed to the association in recent years.

== List of presidents ==
The list of presidents and presidents of honour, published by the association is as follows:

=== Presidents ===
- Eugène Durieu (1855)
- Antoine Jérôme Balard (1858)
- Eugène Péligot (1868)
- Alphonse Davanne (1876)
- Hippolyte Sebert (1901)
- Léon Gaumont (1930)
- Léopold Lobel (1933)
- Edouard Belin (1937)
- Georges Moreau (1953)
- Marcel Abribat (1955)
- Robert Auvillain (1957)
- Fernand Obaton (1969)
- Robert Mauge (1971)
- Jean Prissette (1975)
- Alain Jeanne-Michaud (1993)
- Michel Poivert (1995)
- Paul-Louis Roubert (2010)

=== Presidents of honour ===
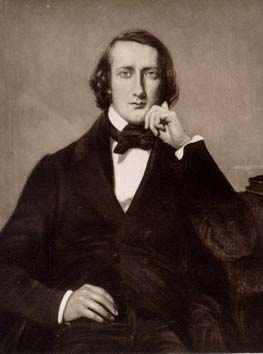
Henri-Victor Regnault (1810-1878): Founder and president of honor of the SFP

- Henri Victor Regnault (1855)
- Jules Janssen (1891)
- Étienne-Jules Marey (1894)
- Gabriel Lippmann (1897)
- Jules Janssen (1900)
- Aimé Laussedat (1903)
- Jules Violle (1906)
- Jules Carpentier (1909)
- Henri Deslandres (1912)
- Prince Roland Bonaparte (1920)
- Louis Lumière (1923)
- Hippolyte Sebert (1926)
- Paul Heilbronner (1929)
- Georges Perrier (1932)
- Charles Fabry (1935)
- Armand de Gramont (1938)
- Fernand Baldet (1947)
- Georges Poivilliers (1949)
- Edouard Belin (1952)
- Georges Poivilliers (1956)
- Marcel Abribat (1958)
- Albert Arnulf (1965)
- Jean-Jacques Trillat (1971–1987)

== Founding members ==
Among the SFP's founding members were:

- Olympe Aguado
- Félix Avril
- Hippolyte Bayard
- Edmond Becquerel
- Louis-Auguste Bisson
- Auguste-Rosalie Bisson
- Louis Désiré Blanquart-Evrard
- Farnham Maxwell-Lyte
- Fortuné Joseph Petiot-Groffier
- Julien Vallou de Villeneuve

== See also ==
- Royal Photographic Society

== Bibliography ==
- Alain Jeanne-Michaud, "La Société Française de Photographie", in France Photographie ISSN 1625-6433, No. 176, April 2002 (in French)
- Michel Poivert, André Gunthert, Carole Troufléau, "L'Utopie photographique. Regard sur la collection de la Société française de photographie", ISBN 2-912132-41-X, exhibition catalogue, le Point du jour, 2004 (in French)
