= Leeds Studies in English =

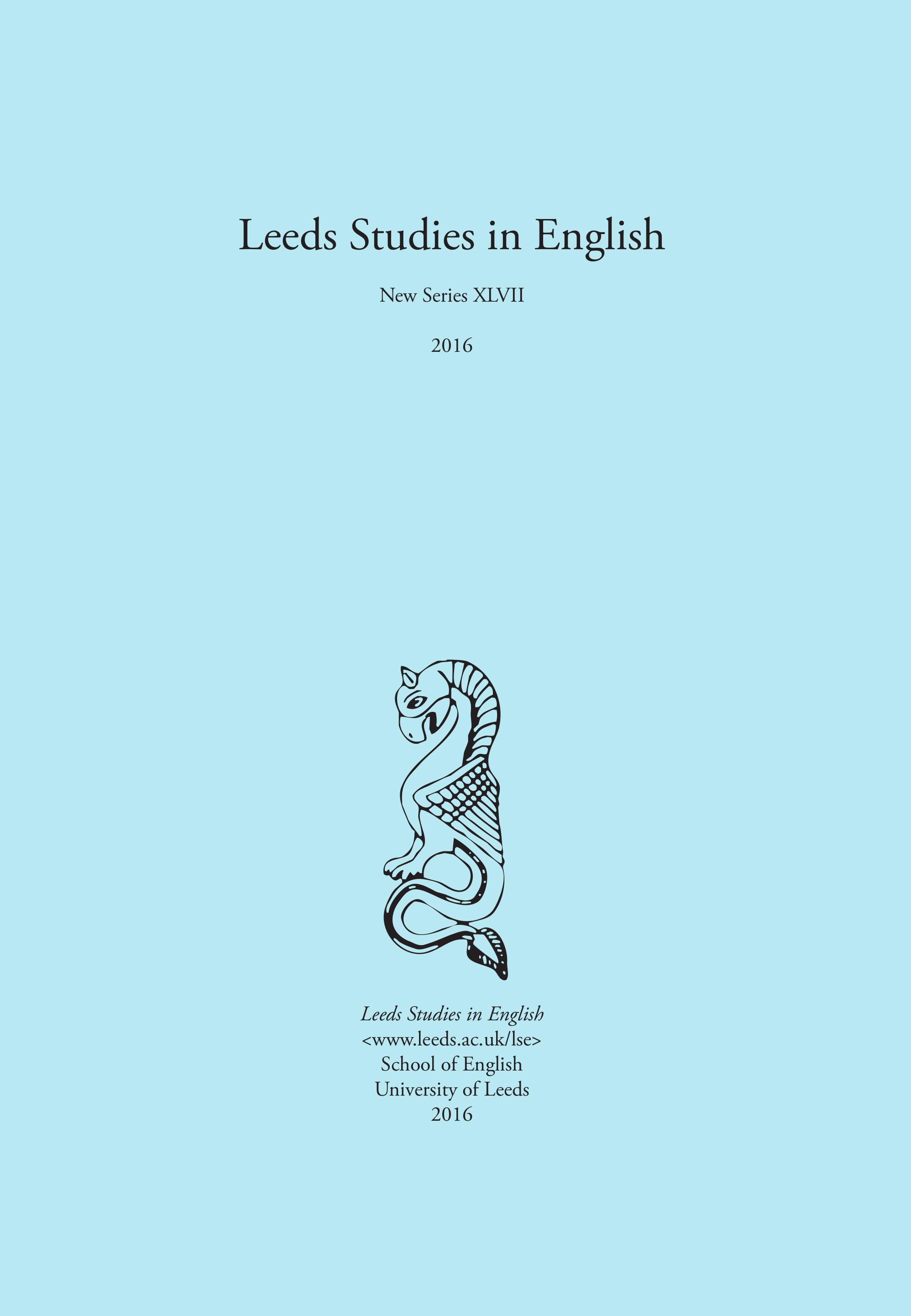
- Discipline: Old English, Middle English and Old Icelandic language and literature
- Language: English

Publication details
- History: 1967-2020. Evolved from Leeds Studies in English & Kindred Languages (1932-1952); succeeded by Leeds Medieval Studies.
- Publisher: School of English Studies, University of Leeds (UK)
- Frequency: annual
- Open access: yes

Standard abbreviations
- ISO 4: Leeds Stud. Engl.

Indexing
- ISSN: 0075-8566
- OCLC no.: 1755705

Links
- Journal homepage

Leeds Studies in English was an annual academic journal dedicated to the study of medieval English, Old Norse-Icelandic, and Anglo-Norman language and literature. It was published by the School of English at the University of Leeds. In 2020, it was announced that Leeds Studies in English would merge with the Bulletin of International Medieval Research to become Leeds Medieval Studies, based in the Leeds Institute for Medieval Studies.

== Editorial policy ==
According to the journal's website in the decade before its transformation into Leeds Medieval Studies,

Leeds Studies in English is an international, refereed journal based in the School of English, University of Leeds. Leeds Studies in English publishes articles on Old and Middle English literature, Old Icelandic language and literature, and the historical study of the English language. After a two-year embargo, past copies are made available free access.

Authors were encouraged to make their work available open-access at any stage of the publication process. Recent volumes also include work on Anglo-Norman, medievalism, and historical linguistics, alongside editions and translations of medieval and early modern texts.

== History ==
The journal was begun as Leeds Studies in English & Kindred Languages by Bruce Dickins, Alan S. C. Ross and R. M. Wilson, who were then all in the Department of English Language at the University of Leeds. It was initially intended to showcase the work of staff and postgraduate students in the department. The first volume emerged in 1932, and further volumes emerged annually until 1938, at which point volumes 7 and 8 were both delayed by the outbreak of the Second World War. During 1945–46, as the war ended, the editors all took new posts, respectively at Cambridge, Birmingham and Sheffield, whereupon 'any chance of refloating Leeds Studies in English with the old crew vanished'. A. C. Cawley and Harold Orton saw volumes 7 and 8 through the press as a single volume in 1952 and hoped to publish more, but this did not eventuate.

However, a new series was launched in 1967, whose history has been recounted in detail by the journal's last editor, Alaric Hall. The new series was initially under the editorship of A. C. Cawley (who had left Leeds in 1959 but returned in 1965) and R. C. Alston (appointed in 1964). The launch came a year after the foundation at Leeds University of the journal Northern History and Alston's foundation of the Scolar Press, and in the same year as the founding of the International Medieval Bibliography and the Institute for Medieval Studies. The editors broadened the scope of the journal to invite contributions from scholars internationally. Although they shortened the title to Leeds Studies in English, they affirmed the journal's multilingual scope.

A book review section was launched in 1990. From 1967 to 1977 the journal was printed by Alston's company Scolar Press, and from 1977 to 1987 the journal was printed from copy-ready type-written text at the university's own printing service. From 1986, Elizabeth Williams, Joyce Hill and Pam Armitage oversaw a transition to word-processed text, with the new format being finalised in 1991. 1986 saw the introduction of the journal's logo, 'based on a panel from the Anglo-Saxon cross in Otley Parish Church, West Yorkshire'.

With the fortieth issue (for 2009, published in 2010), under the editorship of Alaric Hall, the journal began online free-access publication alongside print publication, with a two-year embargo, on the grounds that ‘LSE has always been published by scholars, for scholars; its purpose is to disseminate high-quality research as widely as possible’. All past issues were digitised and made available via Leeds University Library. It also transitioned to typesetting in LaTeX. Print distribution, which had previously been undertaken within Leeds's School of English, was handed over in the same year to Abramis Academic Publishing.

=== Editors ===
dates	editor(s)	editorial assistants, review editors, etc.
1932-37	Bruce Dickins, Alan S. C. Ross and R. M. Wilson	
1952	A. C. Cawley and Harold Orton	
1967-70	A. C. Cawley and Robin C. Alston	
1971-74	A. C. Cawley and Stanley Ellis	Betty Hill (1971)
1975-77	Betty Hill and Stanley Ellis	Peter Meredith
1978-81	Peter Meredith	
1982-87	Elizabeth Williams	Joyce Hill (1986–87)
1988-91	Joyce Hill	Andrew Wawn (1988–90) Stanley Ellis (1990)
1992-94	Andrew Wawn	Lesley Johnson
1995-98	Lesley Johnson and Catherine Batt	
1999-2002	Catherine Batt	
2003	Catherine Batt and Andrew Wawn	
2004-8	Alfred Hiatt and Andrew Wawn	
2009-2020	Alaric Hall	Cathy Hume (2009–12) Victoria Cooper (2010–13) Helen Price (2011) N. Kıvılcım Yavuz (2013–16)

Guest editors included Derek Pearsall (1983); Marie Collins, Joceyln Price and Andrew Hamer (1985); Thorlac Turville-Petre and Margaret Gelling (1987); Geraldine Barnes, Sonya Jensen, Lee Jobling and David Lawton (1989); Clive Upton and Katie Wales (1999); Sarah Carpenter, Pamela King and Peter Meredith (2001); Mary Swan (2006); Janet Burton, William Marx, and Veronica O'Mara (2010); Carole Biggam (2013); and Hannah Bailey, Karl Kinsella, and Daniel Thomas (2017).

Some special issues were Festschriften, honouring Harold Orton (1968, 1999), Arthur C. Cawley (1980–81), Elizabeth Salter (1983), J. E. Cross (1985), Kenneth Cameron (1987), H. Leslie Rogers (1989), Peter Meredith (1998), Meg Twycross (2001), Joyce Hill (2006), and Oliver Pickering (2010).

=== Leeds Texts and Monographs ===
Leeds Studies in English existed in parallel to a series of monograph publications on the same themes as the journal: originally Leeds School of English Language Texts and Monographs (eight volumes, 1935–40), then Leeds Texts and Monographs (new series, seventeen volumes, 1966–2009), and Leeds Texts and Monographs Facsimiles (publishing facsimiles of medieval English drama, eight volumes, 1973–84).
