= Institute for Medieval Studies =

Part of the University of Leeds, England

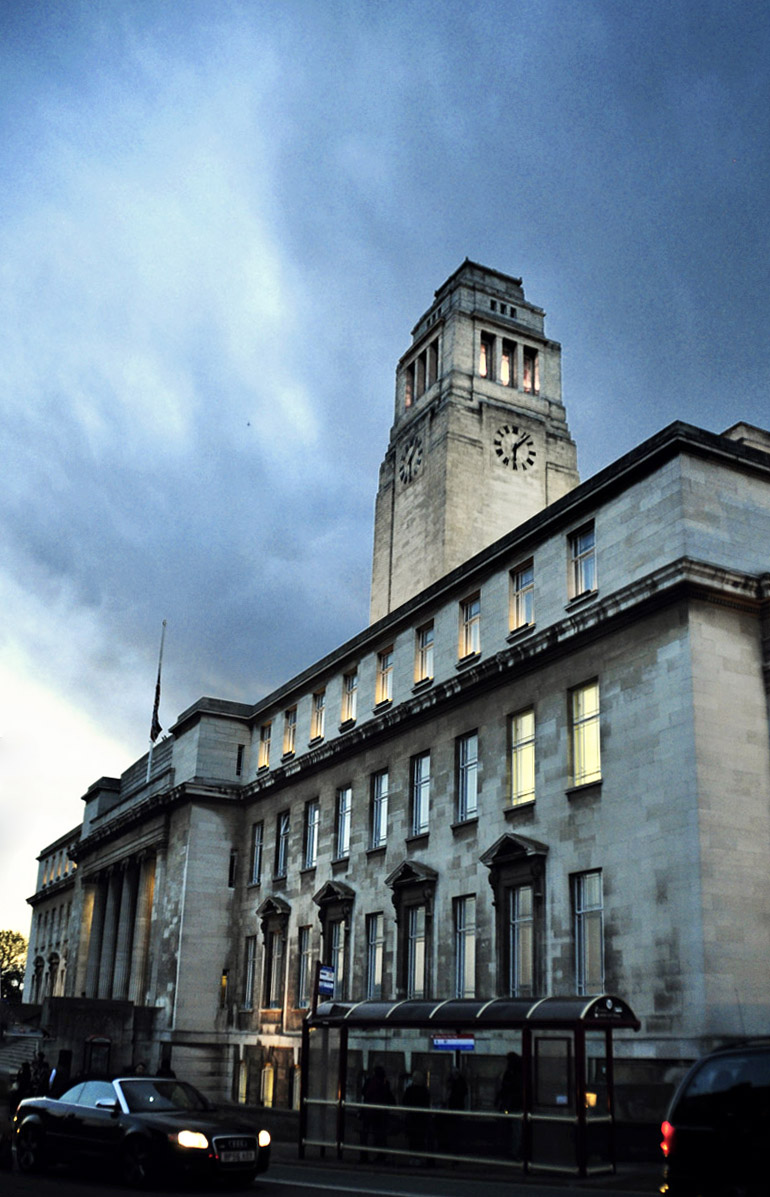
Leeds University's Parkinson Building, home to the Institute.

The Institute for Medieval Studies (IMS‌) at the University of Leeds, founded in 1967, is a research and teaching institute in the field of medieval studies. It is home to the International Medieval Bibliography and the International Medieval Congress.

== History ==
=== Precursors ===
Although Leeds University had seen lively intellectual activity in medieval studies throughout its history, the first formal precursor to the Institute for Medieval Studies was Leeds's 'Medieval Group', founded in October 1951. The group would gather to hear academic papers on relevant topics, preceded by 'sherry in the Chairman's room' and followed 'by supper'. Early chairs were John Le Patourel (1951–71), J. R. Wilkie (1971–77), and A. C. Cawley (1978–79); secretaries were Kenneth William Humphreys (1951–52), A. C. Cawley (1952–59), and William Rothwell (1959–?); and treasurers included Glanville Rees Jeffrey Jones (1951–71). As of the 2018–19 academic year, Medieval Group still existed, within the Institute for Medieval Studies, run by a committee of both staff and graduate students under the aegis of Melanie Brunner, organising papers, workshops, and field trips.

=== The GCMS and IMB (1967–78) ===
The inter-departmental community-building of the Medieval Group was consolidated in 1967, when Le Patourel led the establishment of the Leeds Graduate Centre for Medieval Studies (GCMS). Early directors included Le Patourel (1967–70), A. C. Cawley (1970-72), and R. L. Thomson (1972–77). The centre focused on offering an interdisciplinary MA degree in Medieval Studies that drew on the skills of scholars in a range of departments whose teaching tended to be separated by institutional barriers. It had an important role in building up Leeds's capacity to deliver postgraduate education. It was partly inspired by the recent establishment of the Centre for Medieval Studies, Toronto and a Medieval Studies MA at the University of Manchester under the guidance of J. S. Roskell. However, it lacked any dedicated premises for teaching or students and relied for its budget on petitioning individual departments for funds.

The foundation of the Graduate Centre for Medieval Studies, which came amidst took place alongside a wave of new activities among Leeds medievalists (and in the context of a great expansion of the size and state funding of British universities). Most prominent was the foundation of the International Medieval Bibliography (IMB) by Peter Sawyer, also in 1967. Related endeavours were the founding of the journal Northern History in 1966; the refounding of the medieval-studies-orientated journal Leeds Studies in English (1967) and associated book series Leeds Texts and Monographs (1966); hosting the first colloquium of the Société Internationale pour l'étude du Théâtre Médiéval (1974); and, in 1975, co-ordinating the staging of 42 pageants from the York Mystery Plays on the Leeds University campus.

=== The CMS, IMI, and IMC (1978–2003) ===
In 1977, the Centre's first female director, Lynn Muir, was appointed (1977–82). In 1978 she removed the word 'Graduate' from the name of the Centre, making it the 'Centre for Medieval Studies', and in 1979 won a dedicated room for the Centre, which was christened 'The Le Patourel Room' and housed in a one-time church building which later became the home of the University's Workshop Theatre. Muir was succeeded by Peter Meredith; subsequent directors included Lawrence A. S. Butler (1934–2014) (to 1988), Wendy R. Childs, and Joyce Hill. In 1996, the first appointment was made to the Centre itself, when Mary Swan was made its Director of Studies. She oversaw, in 1999, the introduction of a Ph.D. programme run by the Centre, and in 2000 the shifting of the Le Patourel Room to the University's Parkinson Building, where, as of 2019, it remained.

In 1998, Leeds's Centre for Medieval Studies was described in the Times Higher Education as

Britain's largest: it boasts 38 staff and 60–70 students from 16 humanities departments, plus 14 medieval studies MA students. From this autumn a new PhD programme will teach palaeontology [presumably an error for 'palaeography'], medieval Latin, Hebrew and Greek — crucial tools for students of the period. Medieval studies finally seems to be emerging from its own Dark Ages.

Alongside similar UK centres at Nottingham, Reading and York, the CMS's cross-departmental and interdisciplinary teaching was credited with breathing new life into the study of the Middle Ages.

Meanwhile, in 1995 Leeds University had established the International Medieval Institute (IMI) as a home for the International Medieval Bibliography. Under the aegis of the IMI's then director Simon Forde (1988–95), in collaboration with the Centre for Medieval Studies, the Institute launched the annual Leeds International Medieval Congress, which swiftly became Europe's pre-eminent medieval studies conference.

=== The IMS (2003–) ===
In 2003, major restructuring took place, and the Centre for Medieval Studies and the International Medieval Institute merged to create the Institute for Medieval Studies, an independent unit within Leeds University's Faculty of Arts. These changes took place under the Institute's new director, Richard Morris (2003-2010). The institute now had a fairly large staff of its own, comprising the Director, lecturers (Mary Swan and Bill Flynn), the editorial team of the International Medieval Bibliography (led since 1995 by Alan V. Murray), and the organising staff of the International Medieval Congress (led since 1996 by the Congress Director Axel Müller). However, it also counted among its members medievalists employed by schools across the University, as well as associate fellows from the Royal Armouries Museum and elsewhere in the wider Yorkshire medievalist community.

Because, according to Alaric Hall, "Leeds’s bureaucratic structures struggled to cope with a body not housed within a School", during 2010–12, the Institute was moved into one of the Schools of the Faculty of Arts (the School of History), under the acting directorship of Graham Loud. The restructure coincided with the departure of the IMS's director of studies, Mary Swan, but was consolidated by the creation in the School of a new Chair in Medieval Studies, whose first appointee, Julia Barrow, took up both the chair and the directorship of the Institute in 2012. She was succeeded as director in 2016 by Emilia Jamroziak, who was succeeded in turn in 2019 by Alaric Hall, in 2023 by Fozia Bora, and in 2024 by Iona McCleery.

In 2013, the Leeds University Union Medieval Society was founded by Rose Sawyer to promote student-orientated activities.

== Publications ==
Bulletin of International Medieval Research (2009).

=== Journals ===
From 2021, the IMS has published the annual journal Leeds Medieval Studies (ISSN 2754-4575, ISSN 2754-4583) with rolling, free-access publication online, co-edited by Alan V. Murray, Catherine Batt, and Alaric Hall, with the editorial assistant Lisa Trischler. Leeds Medieval Studies originated in the merger of the Bulletin of International Medieval Research, edited by Alan V. Murray (ISSN 1361-4460), and Leeds Studies in English, first published in 1932.

The Bulletin began in 1995 as a stapled A5 volume of twenty-two pages, produced primarily as a means to keep the International Medieval Institute's burgeoning list of correspondents abreast of developments in the field. it reported on technical developments at the International Medieval Bibliography and in communication among medievalists more generally. As it grew over time, the Bulletin began carrying book reviews, concise overviews of developments in different fields within Medieval Studies, and research articles.

=== Books ===
Between 1975 and 1981 the Institute also published three volumes in a series entitled Leeds Medieval Studies (ISSN 0140-8089):

- The Drama of Medieval Europe: Proceedings of the Colloquium Held at the University of Leeds 10-13 September 1974, ed. by Peter Meredith, Leeds Medieval Studies, 1 (Leeds: University of Leeds, Graduate Centre for Medieval Studies, 1975).
- The Tristan Legend: Texts from Northern and Eastern Europe in Modern English Translation, ed. by Joyce Hill, Leeds Medieval Studies, 2 (Leeds: University of Leeds, Graduate Centre for Medieval Studies, 1977).
- The Passion de Semur, ed. by Peter Durbin and Lynette R. Muir, Leeds Medieval Studies, 3 (Leeds: The University of Leeds, Centre for Medieval Studies, 1981).

== Notable alumni ==
- Emilia Jamroziak, professor of Medieval Religious History at the University of Leeds
- Alison Lowe (1964–), British Labour politician
- Lucy Moore (archaeologist), numismatist and Wikimedian
- Philip A. Shaw, philologist
