= R. C. Alston =

Robin Carfrae Alston, OBE, FSA (29 January 1933 – 29 June 2011) was a bibliographer.

== Early life and education ==
Alston was born in Trinidad. In 1936, his family (owners of a prosperous shipping business) moved to Barbados. He was subsequently sent to Rugby School, which he did not enjoy, although he did develop a lifelong enthusiasm for jazz piano playing. He went to the University of British Columbia for his BA, graduating in 1954. He then took an MA at Corpus Christi College, Oxford.

Following his MA, Alston taught briefly at the University of Toronto from 1956 to 1958, as well as the University of New Brunswick, before moving to King's College London for a PhD on early-modern spelling reform in English. According Stephen Green, Alston 'brought an irrepressible enthusiasm' to this work and the historical bibliography it entailed: 'restless, professionally and personally, in the early 1960s he travelled throughout Europe for months in his VW Beetle, startling the keepers of libraries great and small with his insistence on the first-hand inspection of their collections'. This work has been characterised at the first step on Alston's road towards his magnum opus, his Bibliography of the English Language. In the assessment of Stephen Green, 'Alston was no saint, but a gallant adventurer who often broke rules (and hearts) in the intense pursuit of his truth'.

== Academic career ==
Alston graduated in 1964 and in the same year became a lecturer in English Language and Medieval English Literature in the School of English at the University of Leeds. Inspired by the insistence of F. W. Bateson at Oxford that undergraduates should read set texts in the original editions, Alston founded the Scolar Press in 1966, printing inexpensive facsimiles of over 2000 texts of importance to the history of the English language. For this enterprise, Alston invented the Prismascope to enable photography of fragile books. In 1967, along with A. C. Cawley (Professor of English Language and Medieval English Literature at Leeds), he refounded the journal Leeds Studies in English; it was printed at Scolar Press up to and including 1977. Alston relinquished his lectureship in 1969, but continued teaching at Leeds until 1976. The University's obituary notes that 'he was, and throughout his career remained, an outstanding teacher and lecturer, whose energy and enthusiasm lit up his talks'. He handed over his co-editorship of Leeds Studies in English to Stanley Ellis in 1971. Scolar Press ran until 1973, in which year Alston founded the Janis Press, which used experimental lithographic printing.

Alston left Leeds in 1976, becoming the editor-in-chief of what became the Eighteenth Century Short Title Catalogue in 1977, based at the British Library. Amidst personal tensions with his American collaborator Henry Snyder, Alston left the project in 1989.

In 1990 he became Professor of Library and Archive Studies at the University of London, where he took a key role in developing University College London's digital humanities profile and in 1995 launched the Anglophone world's first postgraduate course in the history of the book at the School of Advanced Study, University of London. He became a professor emeritus on his retirement in 1998.

== Honours ==
Alston became a fellow of the Society of Antiquaries (FSA). In 1992 he was appointed OBE and in 2005 he received the honorary degree of DLitt from University College London.

== Marriages and children ==
In 1957, Alston married Joanna Ormiston, with whom he had three children (two of whom survived him). In 1996, they divorced and Alston married Janet Pedley-King, divorcing in 1999. He subsequently reunited with his former wife Joanna Mitchell where they lived together in Barbados until her death on the 27th of November 2009.

== Publications ==
Alston's most important work was the A Bibliography of the English Language from the Invention of Printing to the Year 1800, which he had nearly completed when he died, with twenty volumes published. It built on the 1927 work of Kennedy, A Bibliography of Writings on the English Language from the Beginning of Printing to the End of 1922.

== Archives ==
Parts of Alston's archive and book collection are held by the National Library of Australia. Information on his archived webpages is here.
