= Simon Forde (medievalist) =

Simon Forde is a publisher and medievalist, noted as the former editor of the International Medieval Bibliography and founder of the International Medieval Congress.

== Education ==
Forde completed a BA at the University of Birmingham in 1980, an MA in 1982, and a PhD in 1985, all with dissertations on late medieval English sermons.

== Career ==
Following postdoctoral research positions at the Pontifical Institute of Medieval Studies at the University of Toronto and Lady Margaret Hall at the University of Oxford, Forde succeeded Catherine R. E. Coutts as the editor of the International Medieval Bibliography at the University of Leeds in 1988, becoming assistant director of the Leeds Centre for Medieval Studies the next year. In 1994 he founded the International Medieval Congress and Leeds's International Medieval Institute (which in 2003 became the Leeds Institute for Medieval Studies), appearing in the 1995–7 University of Leeds Calendars as Director of the Institute (being succeeded as editor of the Bibliography by Alan V. Murray and Marian R. Lefferts). He oversaw much of the digitisation of the formerly print-only Bibliography.

In 1996, Forde left Leeds to work in publishing at Brepols, the publisher of the Bibliography, and in 2006 was a founder of the Co-operative for the Advancement of Research through a Medieval European Network (CARMEN). In 2013 he moved to Amsterdam University Press, becoming head of acquisitions, and in 2014 established Arc-Humanities Press as a publishing arm for CARMEN, an organisation for which, as of 2021, he remained director and editor-in-chief. In 2015–17, he worked at Medieval Institute Publications at the Institute for Medieval Studies at Western Michigan University, succeeding Patricia Hollahan, as managing editor and then director and editor-in-chief.
