= Philip A. Shaw =

British philologist

Academic background
- Education: University of Oxford; University of Leeds

Academic work
- Discipline: Anglo-Saxon studies; Germanic studies; Old Norse studies
- Institutions: University of Sheffield; University of Leicester; University of Durham
- Main interests: Old English language and literature; Germanic religion
- Notable works: Pagan Goddesses in the Early Germanic World (2011)

Philip A. Shaw is a British philologist at Durham University. He specializes in the languages and literatures of the Middle Ages, particularly Old Norse language and literature, and Old English language and literature. He is also an authority on Germanic religion. Shaw has written numerous works on these subjects.

== Biography ==
Philip A. Shaw received his B.A. in English Language and Literature at the University of Oxford, and his Ph.D. in the Institute for Medieval Studies at the University of Leeds. Following postdoctoral work and a position as lecturer in Old and Middle English at the University of Sheffield, Shaw joined the School of English at the University of Leicester in 2009, where by 2021 he was associate professor in English Language and Old English. Shaw is a Fellow of the Higher Education Academy. During Shaw's time at Leicester, in the academic year 2020–21, the university closed its teaching of English Language and of medieval English literature, putting relevant staff at risk of redundancy. In autumn 2021, Shaw took up a lectureship in Medieval Literary Studies at Durham University.

== Select bibliography ==
- (Edited with Penny Eley, Penny Simons, Catherine Hanley and Mario Longtin) Partonopeus de Blois: An Electronic Edition, 2006
- (Edited with Richard Corradini, Christina Pössel and Rob Meens) Texts and identities in the early Middle Ages, 2006
- (With Charles Barber and Joan C. Beal) The English Language: A Historical Introduction, 2009
- Pagan Goddesses in the Early Germanic World: Eostre, Hreda and the Cult of Matrons, 2011
- Names and Naming in 'Beowulf': Studies in Heroic Narrative Tradition (Bloomsbury Academic, 2020), ISBN 9781350145764

== See also ==
- Alaric Hall
- Leonard Neidorf
