= Wawn =

Wawn or WAWN may refer to:

== People ==
- Andrew Wawn (born 1944), British literary scholar
- John Wawn (1801–1859), British politician
- Roy Wawn (188o–1966), Australian rules footballer

== Radio station ==
- WAWN (FM), radio station (89.5 FM) in Franklin, Pennsylvania, United States
