= Peter Meredith =

Peter Meredith (born Ross-on-Wye 1933) was, prior to retirement, a lecturer in medieval and early modern English language and literature. He was editor of the journal Leeds Studies in English from around 1978 to 1981 and chaired its editorial board from 1985 until his retirement. He was also an editor of Medieval English Theatre. He is particularly noted for his contributions, through editing, research, and performance, to the study of medieval English theatre.

== Career ==
Meredith lived and studied in Southampton, Bideford and Eastleigh, followed by undertaking national service in the Royal Air Force. From 1953-57 he was an undergraduate at Exeter College, Oxford. After graduating, he was a schoolteacher until beginning postgraduate study at the University College of North Staffordshire from 1958–60.

In 1961, Meredith gained a position in the English Department at the University of Adelaide, moving to Australia with his 'equally adventurous wife Greta', and was soon promoted to senior lecturer. As well as teaching medieval material, he also taught children's literature there. Meredith moved in 1969 to the English department at the University of Leeds, gaining promotion in 1994 to the Developmental Chair in Medieval Drama, which he held until his retirement around 1998. He was noted at both institutions for his enthusiastic teaching, and as an actor; the latter activity included amateur performances of plays by Shakespeare, Pinter, Osborne, and Gilbert and Sullivan, but also academically rigorous and influential performances of medieval mystery plays. While at Leeds, Meredith was active in developing what was then the Leeds Centre for Medieval Studies and subsequently the International Medieval Congress, along with the Société Internationale pour l'Étude du Théâtre Médiéval (of which he was international president in 1995) and the Records of Early English Drama.

Meredith's retirement was marked by the publication in 1998 of a Festschrift in the form of a special issue of Leeds Studies in English edited by Catherine Batt, which was additionally dedicated to his wife Greta, whose 'contribution to medieval studies at Leeds has', the editor noted, 'been so important'.

== Publications ==
A full list of Meredith's publications up to 1998 was published by his last postgraduate student, James Cummings, updated to 2018 by John Marshall. Key works include:

- with Stanley J. Kahrl, The N-Town Plays: A Facsimile of British Library MS Cotton Vespasian D VIII, Leeds Texts and Monographs, Medieval Drama Facsimiles, 4 (Leeds : School of English, University of Leeds, 1977)
- with Richard Beadle and Richard Rastall, The York Play: A Facsimile of British Library MS Additional 35290 together with a Facsimile of the 'Ordo Paginarum' Section of the A/Y Memorandum Book, Leeds Texts and Monographs, Medieval Drama Facsimiles, 7 (Leeds: School of English, University of Leeds, 1983)
- The 'Mary Play' From the N. Town Manuscript (London and New York: Longman, 1987, repr. Exeter: University of Exeter Press, 1997)
- The Passion Play From the N. Town Manuscript (London: Longman, 1990)
- Mankind: An Acting Edition, Playtexts in Performance (Leeds: Alumnus, 1997)
- The Practicalities of Early English Performance: Manuscripts, Records, and Staging: Shifting Paradigms in Early English Drama Studies, ed. by John Marshall (Abingdon: Routledge, 2018) [collection of essays]
