= James Cummings (academic) =

Anglo-Canadian academic

- Born: James Cummings; 1971 (age 54–55); Regional Municipality of Waterloo, Canada
- Citizenship: United Kingdom, Canada
- Occupations: Reader in Digital Textual Studies and Late Medieval Literature, Newcastle University
- Known for: Digital Humanities; Medieval Theatre; Text Encoding Initiative; Digital Humanities Awards; Digital Humanities at Oxford Summer School; Digital Medievalist
- Board member of: Board of Directors of Text Encoding Initiative (2019 - 2027), Chair (2026-2027); Text Encoding Initiative Technical Council (2005-2019); Founder and Chair of DH Awards; Member of Records of Early English Drama Executive Board; Founder and Director of Digital Humanities at Oxford Summer School (2010-2017); Digital Medievalist (2003 - 2012)
- Spouse: Lucienne Cummings (m. 1999)
- Children: 0

Academic background
- Education: Kitchener-Waterloo Collegiate and Vocational School; University of Toronto (BA (hons)); University of Leeds (MA, PhD)
- Thesis: Contextual Studies of the Dramatic Records in the area around The Wash, c. 1350-1550 (2001)
- Doctoral advisor: Peter Meredith

Academic work
- Discipline: Digital Humanities; Medieval Theatre; Medieval English literature; Textual scholarship; Markup Language
- Institutions: University of Leeds; University of East Anglia; University of Oxford; Newcastle University
- Website: https://www.ncl.ac.uk/elll/people/profile/jamescummings.html

James Cummings (born 1971) is an Anglo-Canadian academic in the fields of digital humanities and late medieval English drama. He is the reader in digital textual studies and late medieval literature at Newcastle University (UK). In the field of digital humanities, he is most associated with contributions to the Text Encoding Initiative, where, after many years on the TEI Technical Council (2005-2019), he was elected to their board of directors in 2019 and became chair of the board of directors in 2026. Outside text encoding, Cummings founded and directed the Digital Humanities at Oxford Summer School (2010-2017). He was one of the founders of Digital Medievalist and served on their executive board (2003-2012). He was the founder and remains 'main instigator' of an annual grassroots openly nominated openly voted Digital Humanities awareness activity 'DH Awards' (2012–Present). He is on the board of directors of the long-running Records of Early English Drama project.
