= International Medieval Congress =

Academic conference in Leeds, England

- Abbreviation: IMC
- Nickname: Leeds
- Formation: July 1994; 32 years ago
- Founder: Institute for Medieval Studies, University of Leeds
- Founded at: University of Leeds
- Location: Leeds, United Kingdom
- Key people: Axel Müller (Director)
- Website: www.imc.leeds.ac.uk

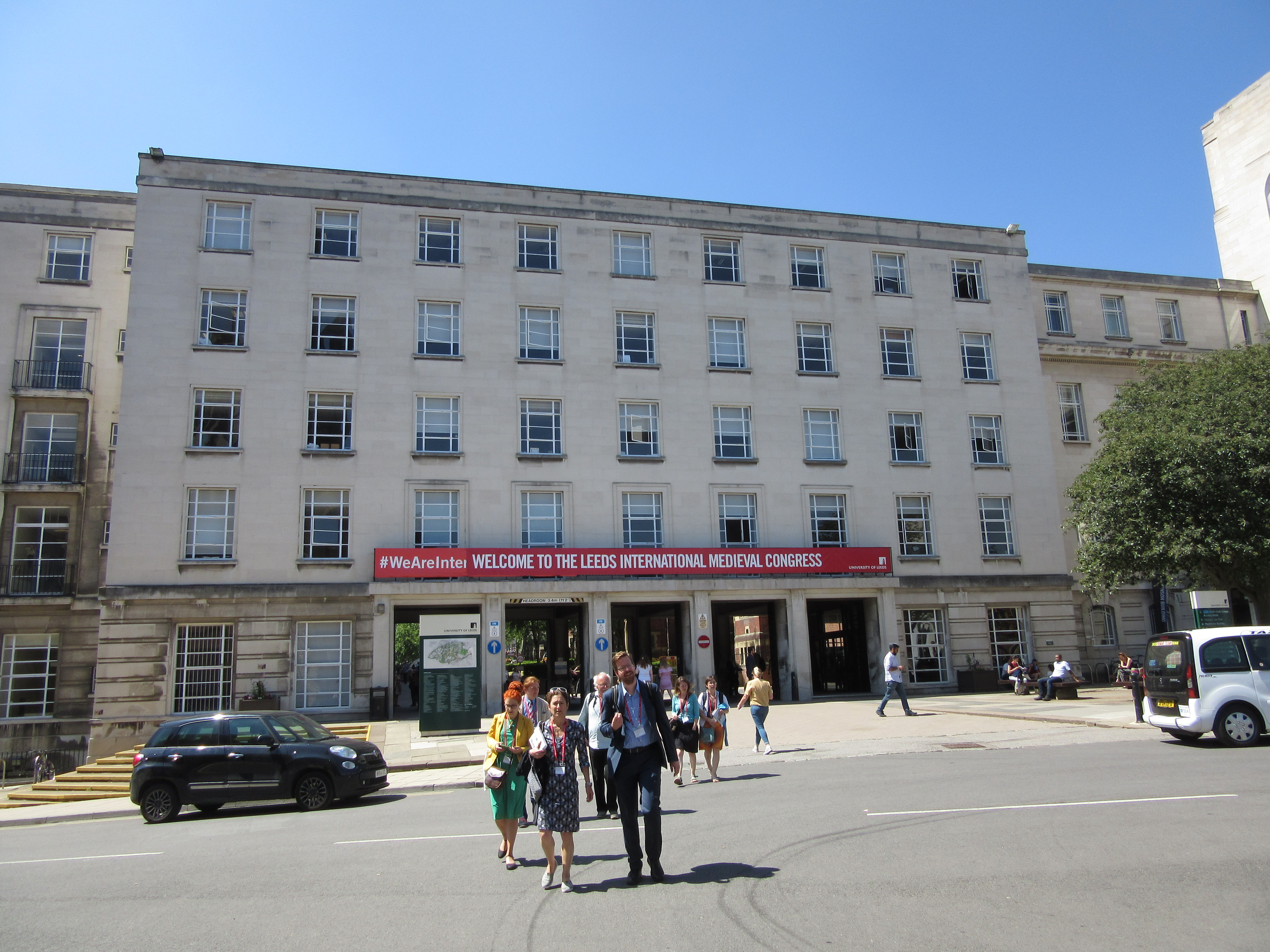
International Medieval Congress (4. July 2018)

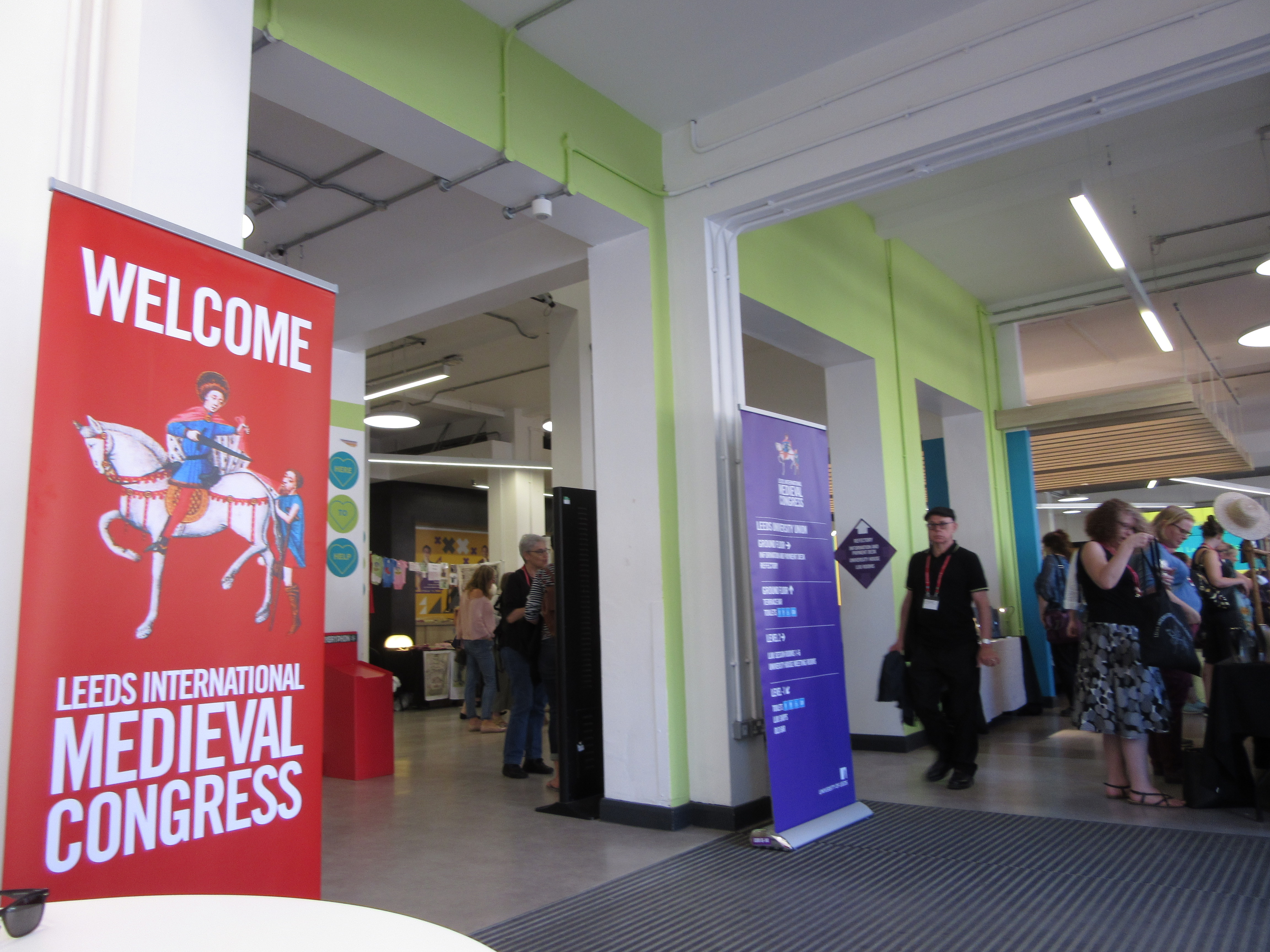
International Medieval Congress (4. July 2018)

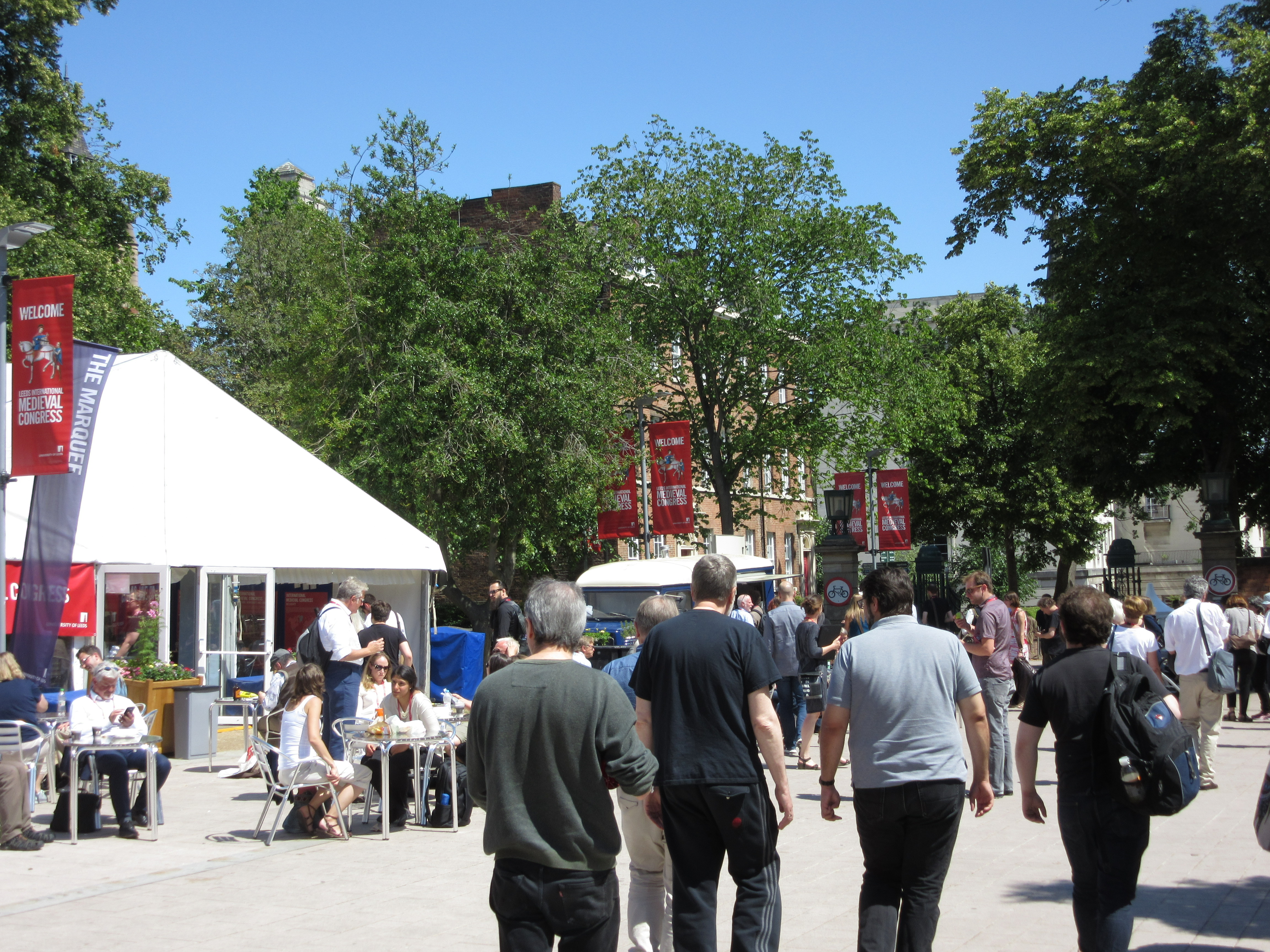
International Medieval Congress (4. July 2018)

The International Medieval Congress (IMC) is an annual academic conference held for scholars specializing in, or with an interest in, the study of the European Middle Ages (c. 300–1500). It is organised and administered by the Institute for Medieval Studies at the University of Leeds and is held in early July. The Congress is the largest annual conference in any subject in the UK, regularly attracting over 2,700 registered participants, and has been used in some research as a barometer for trends in Medieval Studies generally. In 2020 and 2021 the conference was held online (branded as the vIMC) due to restrictions to manage the COVID-19 pandemic. Since 2022, the IMC has been held as hybrid event.

== Aim, scope and participation ==
The main aim of the Congress is to provide an interdisciplinary forum for discussion on all aspects of the European Middle Ages (c. 300–1500). Each year's Congress has one special thematic strand which focuses on an area of interdisciplinary study in a wider context. However, this special thematic strand is not exclusive, and alongside it the IMC provides a platform of debate in all spheres of medieval research. For example, out of 701 sessions at the 2023 Congress, over 400 were on that year's focus, "Networks & Entanglements". Session and paper proposals are invited on all aspects of medieval studies, in any major European language.

Participants of the Congress range from senior scholars to postgraduate students, and interested members of the public such as members of the clergy or independent scholars. Each year, the IMC attracts over 2,500 participants. In 2023, 2,648 participants attended from 60 countries with over 65% of all participants attending from outside the UK.

=== Academic programme ===
The core of the IMC is its academic programme. On average, there are over 700 sessions taking place throughout the IMC, with more than 45 running simultaneously.

Anyone is welcome to propose a session or paper. Papers and sessions are proposed online, with the submissions period beginning in May of the previous year. The deadlines for submissions remain the same each year; 31 August for paper proposals and 30 September for session proposals the year before the relevant Congress.

Organisers of sessions can be individuals or a group of colleagues (post-graduate students, independent scholars, university departments, societies etc.), or a named individual acting on behalf of an academic society, university department, research project, a museum, a journal or publisher, etc.

The IMC has an international Programming Committee made up of 39 scholars with differing specialties who assess all submissions. They then group individual papers into sessions based upon common themes, along with accepting sessions. All abstracts are included in the IMC's online programme.

Participants are encouraged to organise session(s) with a balance of both young and established scholars, and with a geographical diversity, one or more being from mainland Europe. Each participant is only allowed to present one paper.

=== Keynote lectures ===
There are usually 5-8 keynote lectures throughout the Congress, with the first one opening the Congress, and the others taking place at lunchtimes or in the evenings.

=== Events and excursions ===
In addition to the academic programme, the IMC features a large number of events and excursions open to the public run by experts in their field. This includes the Making Leeds Medieval event, which takes place on the final day of the Congress every year on the University of Leeds campus. Each Congress also offers concerts, drama performances and a variety of hands-on workshops. Participants of the Congress also organise an annual football match and, since the move to Leeds University campus, this usually takes place on Woodhouse Moor.

=== Exhibitions and fairs ===
A book fair which features publishers that specialise in medieval studies runs from the Monday to the Thursday of the IMC. Many exhibitors offer special Congress discounts on their latest titles.

Since 2006 a two-day antiquarian and second-hand bookfair, has also been held which includes a number of smaller book dealers.

In recent years a one-day medieval craft fair has been held which includes replica crafts, in addition to crafts inspired by the Middle Ages.

A one-day historical and archaeological societies' fair is also held year on year which allows smaller, often local to the area, societies the opportunity to promote their work.

=== Publications ===
Since its inception, the IMC has been the basis for a book series published by Brepols named International Medieval Research. This publishes themed collections of peer-reviewed papers based on papers given at the IMC; as of 2022 the series had published twenty-six volumes and its general editor is the Congress director, Axel Müller.

== History ==
In 1988, Simon Forde succeeded Catherine R. E. Coutts as the editor of the International Medieval Bibliography, becoming deputy director of the Leeds Centre for Medieval Studies the next year. His colleagues at the Bibliography on his arrival were Ian N. Wood (one of the School of History's academic staff, as Consulting Editor) and two clerical staff, Elizabeth Firth and Sandra Harvey. The director of the Leeds Centre for Medieval Studies was then the archaeologist Lawrence A. S. Butler (1934–2014), and the deputy director Lesley Johnson (1957–). In 1989, the Bibliography team gained Alan V. Murray as Assistant Editor; the historian Wendy Childs took over as director of the centre; and Forde became the deputy director, putting him in influential roles in both of the key Medieval Studies institutions at the university. This arrangement remained stable through to 1996, with the addition in 1992 of two postgraduate editorial assistants, Rachel Kilby and Keren Wick, to the Bibliography team in 1990–92.

In 1990–92, via the Centre for Medieval Studies, this team hosted three annual conferences and, in 1991, a session at the Kalamazoo International Medieval Congress on Medieval Studies, all on 'concepts of nationality and national identity' — a topic characteristic of Medieval Studies' challenging of nationalist historiographies in that period. In Forde's recollection,

in 1992 [recte 1991], Lesley Johnson, Wendy Childs, and I went together to Kalamazoo — I've been going every year since 1986, but it was the first time Lesley and Wendy had been. In those days, it was a bit of a pilgrimage for British scholars. On the way back from Manchester airport, somewhere on the M62, we started thinking: why can't we do a conference like Kalamazoo over here? We spoke to colleagues from the Central European University, as well as contacts at Leeds and across Europe — there seemed to be support for such a venture.

The International Medieval Congress was first held in 1994 with a total participation of 859 delegates, in part to celebrate the 25th anniversary of the International Medieval Bibliography, and in part to commemorate the 1400th anniversary of Gregory of Tours (although papers on all aspects of Medieval Studies were encouraged). The Congress was conceived as a European equivalent to the annual International Congress on Medieval Studies at Kalamazoo, Michigan, begun in the 1960s.

An International Medieval Institute was formed within Leeds's School of History in 1995 to accommodate the International Medieval Bibliography, the Congress, and their burgeoning (if largely fixed-term) staff.

From its inception, the Congress has been managed by a standing committee of medievalists at Leeds. The peer-review and organising of the programme was in time handed over to a much larger programming committee of scholars representing a diverse range of specialisms around the world. One of the postgraduate helpers at the 1994 Congress, Axel Müller, became Congress Assistant for the 1995 event and in 1996 became the IMC director, a position which, as of 2023, he still holds. In 2021, Müller, became the first non-North American recipient of the Robert L. Kindrick–CARA Award for Outstanding Service to Medieval Studies from the Medieval Academy of America.

In 2020, the COVID-19 pandemic led to the cancellation of the in-person conference and it was replaced by an online event on the same date. The IMC 2021 also was an online only event. Since 2022, the IMC has been held as hybrid conference with the vast majority of delegates attending in person.

=== Venue ===
From 1994 to 2012, the IMC took place at Bodington Hall, a university hall of residence, and the adjacent Weetwood Hall, a university-owned hotel and conference centre.

From 2013, the Congress has been held on the campus of the University of Leeds. From that time, the Congress has grown to an attendance of well over 2,500 participants each year. It has also become an important part of the medievalist calendar as it offers a European alternative to the International Congress on Medieval Studies, which is held in Kalamazoo, MI, USA.

=== Themes ===
Each year, the Congress includes a special thematic focus alongside general papers on Medieval Studies. These themes are often linked to a relevant anniversary. Past and forthcoming thematic strands include:

Year	Theme	Dates	Notes	Venue
1994	Gregory of Tours	4-7 July	Commemorating the 1400th anniversary of the death of Gregory of Tours.	Bodington Hall
1995	Crusades	10-13 July	Commemorating the 800th anniversary of the inception of the first Crusade (1095).	Bodington Hall
1996	Medieval Warfare	8-11 July	Celebrating the opening of the Royal Armouries Museum in Leeds.	Bodington Hall
1997	Conversion	14-17 July	Commemorating the 1400th anniversary of the landing of St. Augustine in Kent in 597.	Bodington Hall
1998	Settlements	13-16 July	Commemorating the 50th anniversary of the re-discovery of Wharram Percy through Maurice Beresford in 1948.	Bodington Hall
1999	Saints	12-15 July	Aimed to promote interdisciplinary contacts between those working on all the different aspects of saints' studies.	Bodington Hall
2000	Time & Eternity	10-13 July	Commemorating the millennium in a wider context.	Bodington Hall
2001	Familia & Domus	9-12 July		Bodington Hall
2002	Exile	8-11 July	Commemorating the 700th anniversary of the final expulsion of Dante from Florence.	Bodington Hall
2003	Power & Authority	14-17 July	Marking the 700th anniversary of Boniface VIII's publication of the bull "Unam Sanctam".	Bodington Hall
2004	Clash of Cultures	12-15 July	Marking the 800th anniversary of the capture of Constantinople by the 4th Crusade.	Bodington Hall
2005	Youth & Age	11-14 July		Bodington Hall
2006	Emotion & Gesture	10-13 July		Bodington Hall
2007	Medieval Cities	9-12 July	Celebrating the 800th anniversary of the creation of the borough of Leeds.	Bodington Hall
2008	The Natural World	7-10 July		Bodington Hall
2009	Heresy & Orthodoxy	13-16 July	Marking the beginning of the Albigensian Crusade.	Bodington Hall
2010	Travel & Exploration	12-15 July	Marking the 550th anniversary of the death of Prince Henry 'The Navigator'.	Bodington Hall
2011	Poor...Rich	11-14 July		Bodington Hall
2012	Rules to Follow (or Not)	9-12 July		Bodington Hall
2013	Pleasure	1-4 July		University of Leeds campus
2014	Empire	7-10 July		University of Leeds campus
2015	Reform & Renewal	6-9 July		University of Leeds campus
2016	Food, Feast & Famine	4-7 July		University of Leeds campus
2017	Otherness	3-6 July		University of Leeds campus
2018	Memory	2-5 July		University of Leeds campus
2019	Materialities	1-4 July		University of Leeds campus
2020	Borders	6-10 July	The first virtual IMC, following cancellation of the in-person IMC due to the COVID-19 pandemic. The vIMC attracted the usual number of attendees, 3200, with over 400 papers given alongside a virtual bookfair, craft fair, and conference disco.	Online
2021	Climates	5-9 July		University of Leeds campus
2022	Borders	4-7 July	Theme repeated due to the COVID-19 pandemic.	University of Leeds campus
2023	Networks & Entanglements	3-6 July		University of Leeds campus
2024	Crisis	1-4 July		University of Leeds campus
2025	Worlds of Learning	7-10 July		University of Leeds campus
2026	Temporalities	6-9 July		University of Leeds campus
2027	Communities	5-8 July		University of Leeds campus

=== Controversy ===
The 2017 Congress took place shortly after the US election of Donald Trump and the UK's referendum vote to leave the European Union, which were characterised by growing political use of medievalism by far-right political movements. The Congress theme that year was 'otherness', and rising tensions in the field of medieval studies regarding the subject's complicity in white supremacy 'came to a head' at the Congress. In particular, the event drew criticism because all its plenary speakers on the theme were white men. Moreover, one chair of a plenary session made what Geraldine Heng has characterised as 'a racial joke trivializing skin color'. Specifically, according to The Chronicle of Higher Education, he joked that 'if audience members thought he was just another old, white man, they should just wait until after his holiday at the beach'. One expression of criticism came in the form of an open letter by Ayanna Thompson of the Shakespeare Association of America, which by October 2017 had been signed by nearly 950 people. The Congress issued official apologies, including in its August newsletter, stating 'we are committed to creating an open, accessible, and inclusive environment. We also take the principles of dignity and mutual respect very seriously, and we are sorry for any offence caused by comments made during the introduction to Monday's opening lecture. We are determined to create and encourage a positive, inclusive event for all medievalists to enjoy', adding that 'we are listening to the complex and ongoing discussions surrounding both the IMC and medieval studies as a whole. As part of our review to improve the IMC each year, we have been discussing plans to develop the diversity of the Congress and encourage and support medievalists from under-represented groups'. In Heng's assessment, 'after the cultural trauma inflicted by the conference, fraught conversations on "the whiteness of medieval studies" ignited on both sides of the Atlantic ... Who gets to speak for scholarship on the Middle Ages, and for medievalists ... is now a heated question to be taken up at panels planned for several conferences in 2018'.

== See also ==
- Conferences in Medieval Studies
