= Julia Barrow =

English historian and academic

Julia Barrow FSA FRHistS FBA
- Born: 5 December 1956 (age 69)
- Title: Professor in Medieval Studies
- Awards: Fellow of the Society of Antiquaries of London; Fellow of the Royal Historical Society; Fellow of the British Academy

Academic background
- Education: University of St Andrews; University of Oxford
- Thesis: The Bishops of Hereford and their acta 1163–1219 (1982)

Academic work
- Discipline: Historian
- Sub-discipline: Medieval history; Ecclesiastical history
- Institutions: University of Birmingham; Victoria County History; University of Nottingham; University of Leeds

Julia Steuart Barrow (born 5 December 1956) is an English historian and academic, who specialises in medieval and ecclesiastical history. Since 2012, she has been Professor in Medieval Studies at the University of Leeds and previously served (2012–16) as the Director of the University's Institute for Medieval Studies.

== Early life and education ==
Barrow was born on 5 December 1956 in north-central London, England to historian G. W. S. Barrow and his wife Heather Elizabeth Agnes (née Lownie). She was educated at Westfield School, an all-girls private school in Newcastle upon Tyne. She studied Mediaeval History at the University of St Andrews, and graduated with an undergraduate Master of Arts (MA) degree in 1978. She then undertook postgraduate research at the University of Oxford, and completed her Doctor of Philosophy (DPhil) degree in 1983. Her doctoral thesis was titled "The Bishops of Hereford and their acta 1163–1219".

== Academic career ==
Barrow was a research fellow at the University of Sheffield from 1982 to 1984, and at the Alexander von Humboldt Foundation from 1984 to 1986. From 1986 to 1989, she was a British Academy Postdoctoral Fellow at the University of Birmingham. Then, from 1989 to 1990, she worked for the Victoria County History of Cheshire. From 1990 to 2012, she was a lecturer at the University of Nottingham: she was promoted to senior lecturer in 1999 and to reader in 2004. In 2012, she moved to the University of Leeds where she had been appointed Professor in Medieval Studies and Director of its Institute for Medieval Studies.

Barrow is a member of the Council of the Royal Historical Society. Since 2014, she has been a member of the Joint Committee on Anglo-Saxon Charters. Since 2016, Barrow has been the editor of the journal Northern History.

== Honours ==
On 23 October 1997, Barrow was elected a Fellow of the Society of Antiquaries of London (FSA). In July 2016, she was elected a Fellow of the British Academy (FBA), the UK's national academy for the humanities and the social sciences. She is also a Fellow of the Royal Historical Society (FRHistS). In 2018, she appeared on University of Leeds Women of Achievement Roll of Honour.

== Selected works ==
- Barrow, Julia S.; Brooks, N. P., eds. (2005). St Wulfstan and his world. Aldershot: Ashgate. ISBN 978-0754608028.
- Barrow, Julia; Wareham, Andrew, eds. (2007). Myth, rulership, church and charters: essays in honour of Nicholas Brooks. Aldershot: Ashgate. ISBN 978-0754651208.
- Barrow, Julia (2015). The Clergy in the Medieval World: Secular Clerics, their Families and Careers in North-Western Europe, c.800–c.1200. Cambridge: Cambridge University Press. ISBN 978-1107086388.
- Balzaretti, Ross; Barrow, Julia; Skinner, Patricia, eds. (2018). Italy and early medieval Europe: papers for Chris Wickham (First ed.). Oxford: Oxford University Press. ISBN 978-0198777601.
