= Bibliographie de civilisation médiévale =

Bibliography of medieval civilisation

- Producer: University of Poitiers
- History: 1958–2009
- Languages: English, French, German, Italian, Spanish

Access
- Providers: Brepols Publishers
- Cost: Subscription

Coverage
- Disciplines: Language and literature, philosophy, theology, art history, archaeology, and more in the Western, Byzantine and Islamic worlds
- Record depth: Index and abstract
- Format coverage: Monographs and review articles
- Temporal coverage: AD 300–1500
- Geospatial coverage: Europe, Middle East, North Africa
- No. of records: 65,000+ monographs and miscellany volumes

Links
- Website: www.brepolis.net

The Bibliographie de civilisation médiévale (BCM) is a multidisciplinary bibliographic database covering Europe, North Africa and the Middle East for the entire period from AD 300 to 1500. It aims to provide a comprehensive, current bibliography of monographs and listings of miscellany volumes published worldwide between 1958 and 2009. This way, it is compatible with the International Medieval Bibliography, which focuses on individual articles in journals and miscellany volumes.

The database currently comprises over 65,000 records on every aspect of the Middle Ages. The records are based on the bibliographical supplement to the Cahiers de civilisation médiévale, published by the Centre d'Études Supérieures de Civilisation Médiévale (CESCM) at the University of Poitiers.

In 2004, the CESCM has joined forces with the IBM and Brepols Publishers. A joint interface enables the user to search simultaneously for articles in the IMB and monographs in the BCM.

== See also ==
- List of academic databases and search engines
