= Lynette R. Muir =

English literary scholar (1930–2007)

- Born: 30 December 1930; Eastbourne, Sussex, England
- Died: 2 July 2007 (aged 76)
- Occupation: Scholar

Academic background
- Education: University of Exeter (BA); University of London (PhD)

Lynette Ross Muir (30 December 1930 – 2 July 2007) was an English scholar of medieval literature. She was a Reader in the Department of French Language and Literature at the University of Leeds.

== Life ==
Lynette Ross Muir was born on 30 December 1930 in Eastbourne, England. She received a BA with first-class honours from the University of Exeter in 1951 and a PhD from the University of London in 1956.

Following her studies, Muir spent her academic career at Leeds, where she was, in the assessment of Tony Hunt, "one of the leading figures in the Centre for Medieval Studies". In 1974, Muir organised the first international colloquium on medieval European theatre, which inspired a second colloquium at Alençon and the foundation of the Société Internationale pour l’étude du théâtre médiéval in 1977. In 1975, Muir was central to co-ordinating the staging of 42 pageants from the York Mystery Plays on the Leeds campus. From 1977 to 1982, Muir was the director of Leeds's Graduate Centre for Medieval Studies: in 1978, she oversaw a change in its name to Centre for Medieval Studies and procured dedicated space for the centre for the first time in 1979.

Muir died on 2 July 2007, just as her last book was published; only a delivery delay caused by the 2007 Royal Mail industrial disputes prevented Muir from seeing the volume before she died.

== Selected publications ==
=== Academic ===
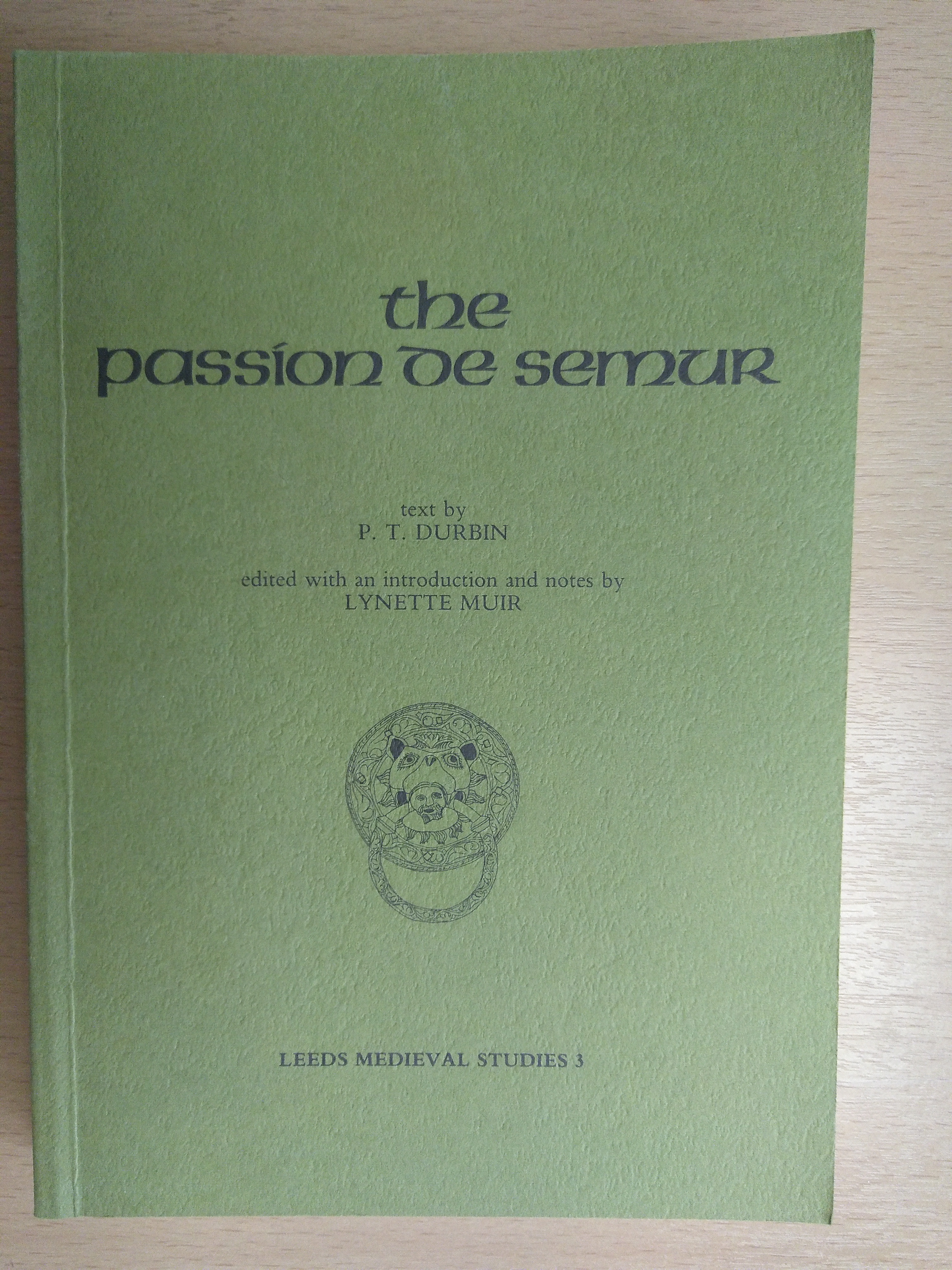
Cover of The Passion de Semur

- Liturgy and Drama in the Anglo-Norman Adam. Blackwell; Society for the Study of Mediaeval Languages and Literature. 1973. ISBN 0-631-15520-1. OCLC 3074336.
- 'Introduction' and 'The Capture of Orange' in William, Count of Orange: Four Old French Epics, ed. by Glanville Price (London: Dent, 1975), ISBN 0874716098
- Durbin, Peter; Muir, Lynette R., eds. (1981). The Passion de Semur. Leeds Medieval Studies, 3. Leeds: The University of Leeds, Centre for Medieval Studies. ISBN 978-0-906441-02-2.
- Literature and Society in Medieval France: The Mirror and the Image, 1100–1500. St. Martin's Press. 1985. ISBN 0-312-48748-7. OCLC 12107409.
- Muir, Lynette R. (1995). The Biblical Drama of Medieval Europe. Cambridge University Press. doi:10.1017/cbo9780511519697. ISBN 978-0-521-41291-9.
- Love and Conflict in Medieval Drama: The Plays and Their Legacy. Cambridge University Press. 2007. ISBN 978-0-521-82756-0. OCLC 76935897.

=== Children's fiction ===
- The Unicorn Window. 1961.
- Nicholas and the Devils. 1985.
- The Girls of St Cyr. 1994.
