= R. M. Wilson (philologist) =

Richard Middlewood Wilson (1908 – 1970) was an English philologist.

== Academic career ==
Wilson graduated with a first class in his BA at the University of Leeds in 1930, and proceeded to MA study there, funded by a University Research Scholarship, under the supervision of E. V. Gordon. He completed the MA with distinction in 1931 and, in the same year, became assistant lecturer in the Department of English Language and Literature under Gordon's successor in Leeds, Bruce Dickins. At this time he lived in the Leeds University hall of residence Devonshire Hall. Wilson was promoted to lecturer in 1937. He continued teaching at Leeds through the Second World War, also undertaking Home Guard duties.

Wilson moved to the University of Sheffield in 1946 as a senior lecturer and head of the Department of English there. In 1955 he was made Professor of English Language (subsequently Professor Emeritus). The university's Special Collections include the R. M. Wilson Memorial Collection, comprising around 180 volumes.

Wilson was a co-editor of the journal Leeds Studies in English and Kindred Languages from its foundation in 1932 to a pause in publication caused by the Second World War. He is best known for his monograph The Lost Literature of Medieval England, which surveyed hints of evidence for traditional, vernacular stories otherwise lost from the written record, and his edition of The Equatorie of the Planetis, which Wilson and his collaborator Derek Price supposed not only to be by Geoffrey Chaucer but even in Chaucer's own hand (on which points they were, however, later proved wrong).

== Major publications ==
- Sawles Warde: An Early Middle English Homily, Leeds School of English Language Texts and Monographs, 3-4 (Leeds: School of English Language in the University of Leeds, 1938)
- Early Middle English Texts, ed. by Bruce Dickins and R. M. Wilson (London: Bowes and Bowes, 1951)
- The Lost Literature of Medieval England (New York: Philosophical Library, 1952); 2nd edn (London: Methuen, 1970), ISBN 0416170005
- with N. R. Ker, The English Text of the Ancrene Riwle, Early English Text Society, original series, 229 (London: Oxford University Press, 1954)
- with Derek John de Solla Price, The Equatorie of the Planetis. Peterhouse Cambridge. Manuscript. 75.I. (Cambridge: Cambridge University Press, 1955)
- with Percy H. Reaney, A Dictionary of British Surnames (London: Routledge and Kegan Paul, 1958)
