= Early Theatre =

- Discipline: Dramatic arts
- Language: English
- Edited by: Helen Ostovich

Publication details
- Former name: REED Newsletter
- History: 1998-present
- Publisher: Centre for Reformation and Renaissance Studies (Canada)
- Frequency: Biannually

Standard abbreviations
- ISO 4: Early Theatre

Indexing
- ISSN: 1206-9078
- OCLC no.: 40564695

Links
- Journal homepage

Early Theatre is a peer-reviewed academic journal specialising in the study of medieval and early modern theatre and drama, particularly in England, Scotland, Ireland, and Wales. The journal originally evolved out of the REED Newsletter, which was published biannually by the Records of Early English Drama from 1976 to 1997. The first issue was published in 1998.
