= Alaric Hall =

British philologist

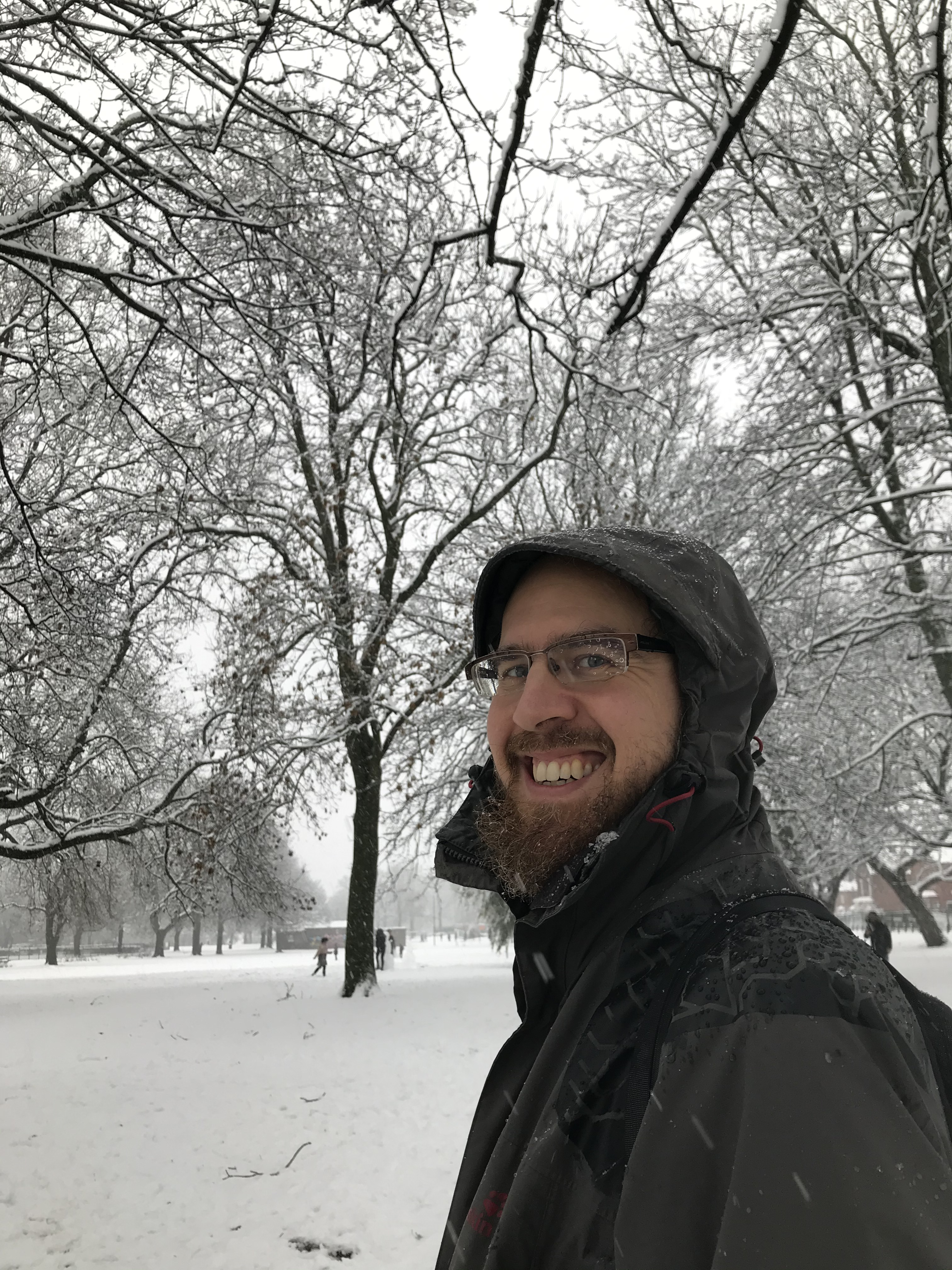
- Hall in 2021
- Born: 1979 (age 46–47); United Kingdom
- Known for: Medieval scholarship

Academic background
- Education: University of Cambridge; University of Glasgow

Academic work
- Discipline: Anglo-Saxon studies; Old Norse studies
- Institutions: University of Leeds
- Main interests: Anglo-Saxon England; Icelandic; Old English; Middle English
- Notable works: Elves in Anglo-Saxon England (2007)

Alaric Hall (born 1979) is a British philologist who is an associate professor of English and former director of the Institute for Medieval Studies at the University of Leeds. He has, since 2009, been the editor of the academic journal Leeds Studies in English and its successor Leeds Medieval Studies.

== Biography ==
Hall received his B.A. in Anglo-Saxon, Norse and Celtic from the University of Cambridge, his M.Phil. in Medieval Studies from the University of Glasgow, and his Ph.D. in English from the University of Glasgow. His Ph.D. thesis was on elves in Anglo-Saxon England.

He then became an associate professor of English and director of the Institute for Medieval Studies at the University of Leeds. Hall researches and teaches the languages, cultures and history of Northwest Europe in the Middle Ages. He has written and edited several works on these subjects. Hall has written on Icelandic language and literature.

== Work ==
His 2007 book Elves in Anglo-Saxon England received positive academic reviews. The medievalist and Tolkien scholar Tom Shippey described the work as an "exceptionally thorough study", while the Tolkien scholar Dimitra Fimi called it a "solidly scholarly work, with meticulous discussion of philological matters, and also an open-minded (although strictly evidence-based) attempt to look at the bigger picture."

In 2013 Hall and his coauthors published the first translation from Icelandic into English of the popular fifteenth-century chivalric saga Sigrgarðs saga frœkna, followed thirteen years later by the first complete manuscript stemma for it.

== Politics ==
Hall is an environmental campaigner, and since 2018 has regularly stood for election to Leeds City Council for the Green Party of England and Wales. For most of the 2010s he was a resident of the Leeds eco-building Greenhouse and was active in community organising in the local area of Beeston and Holbeck. His activities included campaigning in relation to the United Kingdom cladding crisis.

Within academia, Hall supports open-access publishing and has made his own research freely available online. Correspondingly, he edits Wikipedia, and incorporates editing into his teaching and research at the University of Leeds. He is a member of the University and College Union, campaigning during the 2013 and 2018–2020 UK higher education strikes.

== Select bibliography ==
- Elves in Anglo-Saxon England: Matters of Belief, Health, Gender and Identity, 2007
- Interfaces Between Language and Culture in Medieval England, 2010
- Útrásarvíkingar: The Literature of the Icelandic Financial Crisis (2008–2014), 2020

== See also ==
- Songs for the Philologists
