= Winifred Cawley =

English author of children's books

- Born: Winifred Cozens; 24 January 1915 Felton, Northumberland, England
- Died: 8 May 2001 (aged 86)
- Education: University College London
- Notable awards: Guardian Children's Fiction Prize (1975)
- Spouse: Arthur Clare Cawley

Winifred Cawley nee Cozens (24 January 1915 – 8 May 2001) was an English teacher and author of children's books. Her 1974 novel, Gran at Coalgate, won the 1975 Guardian Children's Fiction Prize, a book award judged by a panel of British children's writers, and was a commended runner up for the Carnegie Medal from the Library Association, recognising the year's best children's book by a British subject. (Note: Today there are usually eight books on the Carnegie shortlist. According to CCSU, there were about 160 commendations of two kinds in 49 years from 1954 to 2002, including Cawley and two others in 1974 (one highly commended).)

== Life ==
Winifred was the daughter of servants in Felton, Northumberland, went to school in nearby Wallsend-on-Tyne, and continued at Newcastle University on scholarship for English studies. In 1937, she attended to University College London to earn a teaching diploma. She began study for a master's degree in Restoration drama but dropped out when she married Arthur Clare Cawley. She pursued a teaching career wherever he worked for the British Council: Romania, Yugoslavia, Egypt, Sheffield, Brisbane, Leeds.

In Brisbane, Australia, she wrote her first novel, Down The Long Stairs (1964), which she mailed to Oxford University Press. It was followed by Feast of the Serpent (1969), and then Gran at Coalgate (1974). Her last novel was the semi-autobiographical Silver Everything And Many Mansions (1976). All four novels are set in Northumberland. The first two are English Civil War stories set in 1648 and 1649. The third features the dispute over wages and hours of British coal miners, and May lockout of miners, that is famous for the sympathetic General Strike of 1926. The fourth is based on her own experiences "growing up poor in the northeast of England between the wars".

According to Julia Eccleshare, Children's Book Editor for The Guardian, Cawley's four books for children "made a significant contribution in the early days of social realism in children's books ... Now so fashionable, stories about children from less affluent homes were almost non-existent until the late 1950s and 60s ..."; "Cawley contributed to the expanding horizons of children's books, not only on matters of class but also on the importance of place and region."

== Publications ==
- Feast of the Serpent (1970)
- Down the Long Stairs (1974)
- Gran at Coalgate, illustrated by Fermin Rocker (1974)
- Silver Everything and Many Mansions, illustrated by William Stobbs (1976)
