= Emilia Jamroziak =

Polish history professor

Emilia Jamroziak is professor of medieval religious history at Adam Mickiewicz University in Poznań. Jamroziak is a specialist in medieval British and European religious history of the 12th to the 16th centuries, the Cistercian order, and frontiers and borders in medieval Europe. She was the director of the Institute for Medieval Studies at the University of Leeds from 2016 to 2019.

== Education ==
Jamroziak took her BA at Adam Mickiewicz University in Poznań, her MA at Central European University, and her PhD University of Leeds (where her thesis, submitted in 2001, was entitled 'Rievaulx Abbey and its social environment, 1132–1300').

== Career ==
Jamroziak gained a permanent lectureship in the University of Leeds's School of History in September 2005, joining the Institute for Medieval Studies around the same time. She became Senior Lecturer in 2008 and Professor of Medieval Religious History in 2014. She was the recipient of the Humboldt Research Fellowship for Experienced Researchers, which she held at the TU Dresden in 2015–2016, and in 2019-2020 she was a holder of MWK-COFUND fellowship at the Max Weber Kolleg at the University of Erfurt.

In 2024–25 Jamroziak held the visiting position of Named Chair of Honour of Professor Maria Janion at the University of Gdańsk. In autumn 2025, she took up a professorship at Adam Mickiewicz University.

== Selected publications ==
- The Cistercian Order in Medieval Europe 1090-1500. Routledge, 2013. (Medieval World Series)
- Monasteries on the Borders of Medieval Europe: Conflict and Cultural Interaction. Brepols, 2013. (Edited with K. Stöber) (Medieval Church Studies 28)
- Survival and Success on Medieval Borders: Cistercian Houses in Medieval Scotland and Pomerania from the Twelfth to Late Fourteenth Century. Brepols, 2011. Medieval Texts and Cultures of Northern Europe series.
- Religious and Laity in Northern Europe 1000-1400: Interaction, Negotiation, and Power. Brepols and Monash University, 2007. (Edited with J.E. Burton)
- Rievaulx abbey and its social context 1132-1300: memory, locality and networks. Brepols, 2005.
