= Sarah Carpenter =

Sarah Carpenter is an academic specialising in English literature and was head of department at the University of Edinburgh from 2003 to 2006.

Carpenter gained a PhD from the University of Oxford researching allegory in Tudor drama. She is an editor of the journal Medieval English Theatre (MeTH), and a contributor to Records of Early English Drama (REED). She has published numerous articles on early theatre and masque, and performance at the English and Scottish royal courts.

== Selected publications ==
- "The Theatre Scene I", in Randall Stevenson and Greg Walker, The Oxford Handbook of Scottish Theatre (Oxford, 2025).
- "The Places of Foolery: Robert Armin and fooling in Edinburgh", Medieval English Theatre, 37 (2015).
- "Laughter and Sin: Vice Families in Tudor Interludes", Theta XII, Théâtre Tudor (2016), pp. 15-38
- "Laughing at Natural Fools", Theta XI, Théâtre Tudor (2013), pp. 3–22
- "Gely with tharmys of Scotland and England: Word, Image and Performance at the Marriage of James IV and Margaret Tudor", in Fresche Fontanis (Cambridge Scholars Press, 2013), pp. 165–178.
- "Plays and Playcoats: A Courtly Interlude Tradition in Scotland?", Comparative Drama, 46:4 (Winter 2012), pp. 475–496.
- "Masking and politics: the Alison Craik incident, Edinburgh 1561", Renaissance Studies, 21:5 (November 2007), pp. 625–636.
- "To thexaltacyon of noblesse: A Herald's Account of the Marriage of Margaret Tudor to James IV", Medieval English Theatre 29 (2007).
- "Performing Diplomacies: The 1560s Court Entertainments of Mary Queen of Scots", Scottish Historical Review, 82:2 no. 214 (2003), pp. 194–225
- with Meg Twycross, Masks and Masking in Medieval and Early Tudor England (Ashgate, 2002).
- "Women and Carnival Masking", Records of Early English Drama Newsletter, 21:2 (1996), pp. 9–16.
- "The Sixteenth-century Court Audience: Performers and Spectators", MeTH, 19 (1997), pp. 18–28.
- "Walter Binning: Theatrical and Decorative Painter", MeTH, 10 (1988), pp. 17–25.
- "Morality-Play Characters", Medieval English Theatre, 5:1 (1983), pp. 18–28.
