= Ibn al-Furat =

Egyptian historian

- ابن الفرات
- Born: 1334 CE; Cairo, Egypt
- Died: 1405 CE
- Occupations: Historian, Notary Public

Academic background
- Influences: Yusuf ibn Abd al-Rahman al-Mizzi, Al-Dhahabi

Academic work
- Era: Medieval Islamic period
- Main interests: Universal history, Islamic history
- Notable works: Taʾrīkh al-duwal wa ’l-mulūk (History of the Dynasties and Kingdoms)

Nāṣir al-Dīn Muḥammad b. ʿAbd al-Raḥīm b. ʿAlī al-Miṣrī al-Ḥanafī (Arabic: ناصرالدين محمد بن عبدالرحيم بن علي المصري الحنفي) (1334–1405 CE), better known as Ibn al-Furāt, was an Egyptian historian, best known for his universal history, generally known as Taʾrīkh al-duwal wa ’l-mulūk ("History of the Dynasties and Kingdoms"), though the manuscripts themselves call it al-Ṭaʾrīq al-wāḍiḥ al-maslūk ilā tarājim al-khulafā’ wa ’l-mulūk. Ibn al-Furat's work is of particular importance for modern scholars due to its high level of detail and the mostly verbatim use of a wide variety of sources, including Christian and Shia authors suspect to mainstream orthodox Sunni historiography. Some of these works survive only through Ibn al-Furat's reuse of them.

== Life ==
The earliest and fullest account of Ibn al-Furat's life is provided by Ibn Hajar al-‘Asqalani. He records that Ibn al-Furat was born to a well-known and learned family, in Cairo in 807/1334. Lacking independent means, Ibn al-Furat made a living partly through undertaking bureaucratic tasks such as working as a notary public and issuing marriage contracts. However, he also attained expertise in hadith, gaining hadith licenses from Yusuf ibn Abd al-Rahman al-Mizzi and Al-Dhahabi, both based in Damascus. He taught and preached at the Muʿizziyya school in Fustat. Little more is known about his life.

== Work ==
Al-Furat's history survives, incomplete, in only a single set of volumes. Those covering the period before 1107 CE seem to have been drafts, and those covering 1107 CE onwards to have been fair copies. All include verbatim quotations of other sources, and make careful use of rubrication, catchwords, spaces for extra information, and annotations; consequently, Fozia Bora has argued that the collection should be seen not simply as a narrative history but rather an archive of sources. The surviving volumes and their contents are as follows:

years covered		manuscript	notes
(CE)	(AH)		
'Patriarchs from Seth to Isaac' (vol. 3)		London, British Library Or. 3007	draft
'Sassanian kings to Jahili poets' (vol. 8)		Paris, MS Blochet 5990	draft
'early period' (vols 9–11)		Bursa, Inebey Library, Huseyin Çelebi MSS, 782-84	draft
early Islamic history		Paris, MS de Slane 1595	A scribal copy, annotated by Ibn al-Furat.
1107-27	501-21	Vienna, Austrian National Library, Cod. A. F. 117	fair copy
1128-48	522-43	Vienna, Austrian National Library, Cod. A. F. 118	fair copy
1149-66	544-62	Vienna, Austrian National Library, Cod. A. F. 119	fair copy
1167-71 1190-92 1194-1202	563-67 586-68 591-99	Vienna, Austrian National Library, Cod. A. F. 120 (incomplete)	fair copy
1203-26	600-24	Vienna, Austrian National Library, Cod. A. F. 121	fair copy
1227-40	625-38	Rabat, no classmark	fair copy
1241-59	639-58	Vatican Library, MS Arab 720	fair copy
1260	659	lacuna	
1261-72	660-71	Vienna, Austrian National Library, Cod. A. F. 122	fair copy
1273-83	672-82	Vienna, Austrian National Library, Cod. A. F. 123	fair copy
1284-96	683-96	Vienna, Austrian National Library, Cod. A. F. 124	fair copy
1297-1386	697-788	lacuna	
1387-96	789-99	Vienna, Austrian National Library, Cod. A. F. 125	fair copy

Ibn al-Furat's history seems never to have been copied wholesale, but was sold by his son and was used by scholars based in Cairo and Damascus over the next couple of centuries, proving influential as both a narrative and a repository of sources. How it came into its present libraries is not known.

In Morton's summary of Bora's assessment of Ibn al-Furat's historiographical technique,

his prime ambition was not to advance a monolithic discourse or to make any claim to religious superiority, but rather to collate and present sources from the period itself, giving priority to eyewitnesses or especially well-informed authors. For this reason, he was fully prepared to include extracts from texts written by Ismāʿīlī authors and [...] it seems that he did not attempt to manipulate these texts (i.e. by reworking them or editing them to achieve a specific political/religious/cultural goal). Thus, they were generally left in their original condition, complete with a full attribution to their provenance. Nor, it seems, did he attempt to gather only those extracts that were consistent with a single overarching discourse. [...] Ibn al-Furāt’s work should be viewed as that of an archivist; a representative of a “bookish” Mamlūk culture closely concerned with the textual traditions that it had inherited.

== See also ==
- List of Muslim historians

== Sources ==
- Cahen, Claude (1971). "Ibn al-Furāt". In Lewis, B.; Ménage, V. L.; Pellat, Ch. & Schacht, J. (eds.). The Encyclopaedia of Islam, Second Edition. Volume III: H–Iram. Leiden: E. J. Brill. pp. 768–769. OCLC 495469525.
- "İBNÜ'l-FURÂT, Nâsırüddin - An article published in 21st volume of Turkish Encyclopedia". TDV Encyclopedia of Islam (44+2 vols.) (in Turkish). Istanbul: Presidency of Religious Affairs, Centre for Islamic Studies. 1988–2016. pp. 45–46.
