= Fozia Bora =

Lecturer in Middle Eastern history

Fozia Bora is a lecturer in Middle Eastern history and Islamic history at the School of Languages, Cultures and Societies at the University of Leeds. Her research and teaching is concerned primarily with Arabic history and historiography, in particular, Arabic historiography of the 6th-9th Islamic centuries (12th-15th centuries CE). In 2021, she was named as one of the university's 'Women of Achievement'.

Her 2015 article "Did Salah al-Din Destroy the Fatimids' Books? An Historiographical Enquiry", published in the Journal of the Royal Asiatic Society, won the Royal Asiatic Society's Staunton Prize, while her 2019 Writing History in the Medieval Islamic World, a study of Taʾrīkh al-duwal wa-l-mulūk (The History of Dynasties and Kings) by Ibn al-Furāt, was characterised by its first reviewer as 'a truly impressive piece of scholarship'.

== Publications ==
Bora's publications include:

- Writing History in the Medieval Islamic World: The Value of Chronicles as Archives (London: Tauris, 2019), ISBN 9781784537302
- A Mamluk Historian's Holograph. Messages from a Musawwada of Tarīkh, Journal of Islamic Manuscripts, Volume 3, Number 2, 2012, pp. 119.
- Article for The Conversation (July 2015; reprinted in Newsweek Europe, Express Tribune Karachi and CNN.com): 'Discovery of ‘oldest’ Qur'an fragments could resolve enigmatic history of holy text'.
