= Andrew Wawn =

English professor of Anglo-Icelandic literature

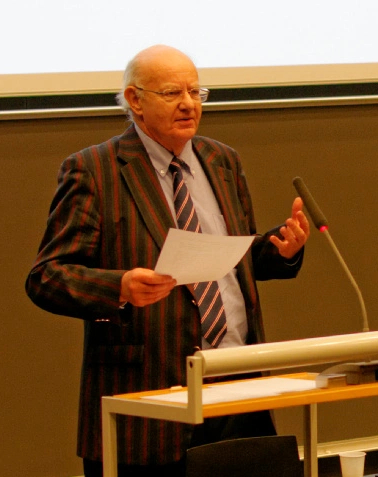
- Andrew Wawn addresses the 2013 Symposium in Honour of George Stephens (1813-1895)
- Born: October 1944 (age 81); Wirral, Cheshire, England
- Education: University of Birmingham
- Known for: The Vikings and the Victorians (2000)
- Title: Emeritus professor

Andrew Nicholas Wawn (born October 1944) is emeritus professor of Anglo-Icelandic literature at the University of Leeds and an expert on Old Norse sagas and their reception in the modern era.

== Early life ==
Andrew Wawn was born in Wirral, Cheshire, England, in October 1944. He attended Birkenhead School, where he cultivated an interest in golf. Following a BA at the University of Birmingham, he completed his PhD there in 1969 with a thesis entitled "The Plowman's Tale: Critical Edition". Alongside his studies of medieval English at Birmingham, he also took part in extramural classes in Old Norse.

== Career ==
In 1972, Wawn gained a lectureship at the University of Keele, where he taught Old and Middle English, the history of the English language, stylistics, and other subjects. Finding that 'það var skemmtilegra að lesa fornar íslenskar bókmenntir heldur en þær ensku' ('more entertaining to read Old Icelandic literature than English'), he began teaching Old Icelandic at Keele, and in September 1978 paid his first, week-long visit to the island, finding its autumn drizzle congenial to his temperament. His research interests shifted gradually to Iceland and he became a regular visitor; his work focused on eighteenth- and nineteenth-century English visitors to Iceland, and the reception of medieval Icelandic literature in Britain.

In 1983, Wawn moved to the University of Leeds, building on a heritage of Icelandic studies there dating back to the interwar teaching of J. R. R. Tolkien and E. V. Gordon, and the foundation of the Bogi Melsteð Collection there. At Leeds, while continuing to teach medieval English, Wawn extended his teaching from Old to Modern Icelandic, succeeding in sustaining students' interest in the subject in the face of the introduction of shorter modules, which reduced the scope for language-learning, and the attractions of other literature on an increasingly diverse syllabus. Wawn was promoted from senior lecturer to reader in English and Icelandic studies in 1995, and subsequently to Professor of Anglo-Icelandic Studies. In 2007, he was awarded the Knight’s Cross of the Icelandic Order of the Falcon for services to Icelandic studies. He retired in 2009 and was made a professor emeritus.

Wawn's monograph The Vikings and the Victorians: Inventing the Old North in Nineteenth-century Britain (2000) was the first book-length treatment of the reception of the Vikings in the Victorian age. Roberta Frank found that 'in its broad canvas and energetic research, its pace and wit and its learning lightly worn, Wawn's book is exemplary, a work of humane and original scholarship'.

Wawn edited the journal Leeds Studies in English solo from 1992 to 1994, and was co-editor from 2003 to 2008. He was president of the Viking Society for Northern Research from around 2000 to 2003, and was one of editors of the Society's journal, Saga-book, around the same period. In the year of his retirement, his sixty-fifth birthday was marked by the publication of a Festschrift.

== Selected publications ==
=== Author ===
- The Anglo Man: Þorleifur Repp, Philology and Nineteenth-Century Britain, Studia Islandica 49. Reykjavík, 1991.
- Northern Antiquity: The Post-medieval Reception of Edda and Saga. Hisarlik Press, 1994. ISBN 1874312184
- The Iceland Journal of Henry Holland, 1810 (Hakluyt Society, Second Series). 1999
- The Vikings and the Victorians: Inventing the Old North in Nineteenth-century Britain. D.S. Brewer, 2000. ISBN 9780859915755

=== Editor ===
- Approaches to Vinland. 2001. (Sigurður Nordal Institute Studies, 4) (edited with Þórunn Sigurðardóttir)
- Constructing Nations, Reconstructing Myth: Essays in Honour of T.A. Shippey. 2008. (Making the Middle Ages) (Joint editor) ISBN 978-2503523934

=== Translator ===
- Vésteinn Ólason, Dialogues with the Viking Age, trans. by Andrew Wawn. Reykjavík, 1998.
- Margrét Eggertsdóttir, Icelandic Baroque: Poetic Art and Erudition in the Works of Hallgrímur Pétursson, trans. by Andrew Wawn, Islandica 66. Ithaca, 2014.
- Úlfar Bragason, Reykjaholt Revisited: Representing Snorri in Sturla Þórðarson's Íslendinga saga, trans. by Andrew Wawn, Rit, 106 (Reykjavík: Stofnun Árna Magnússonar í íslenskum fræðum, 2021) ISBN 978-9979-654-59-9
