= 2013 United Kingdom higher education strike =

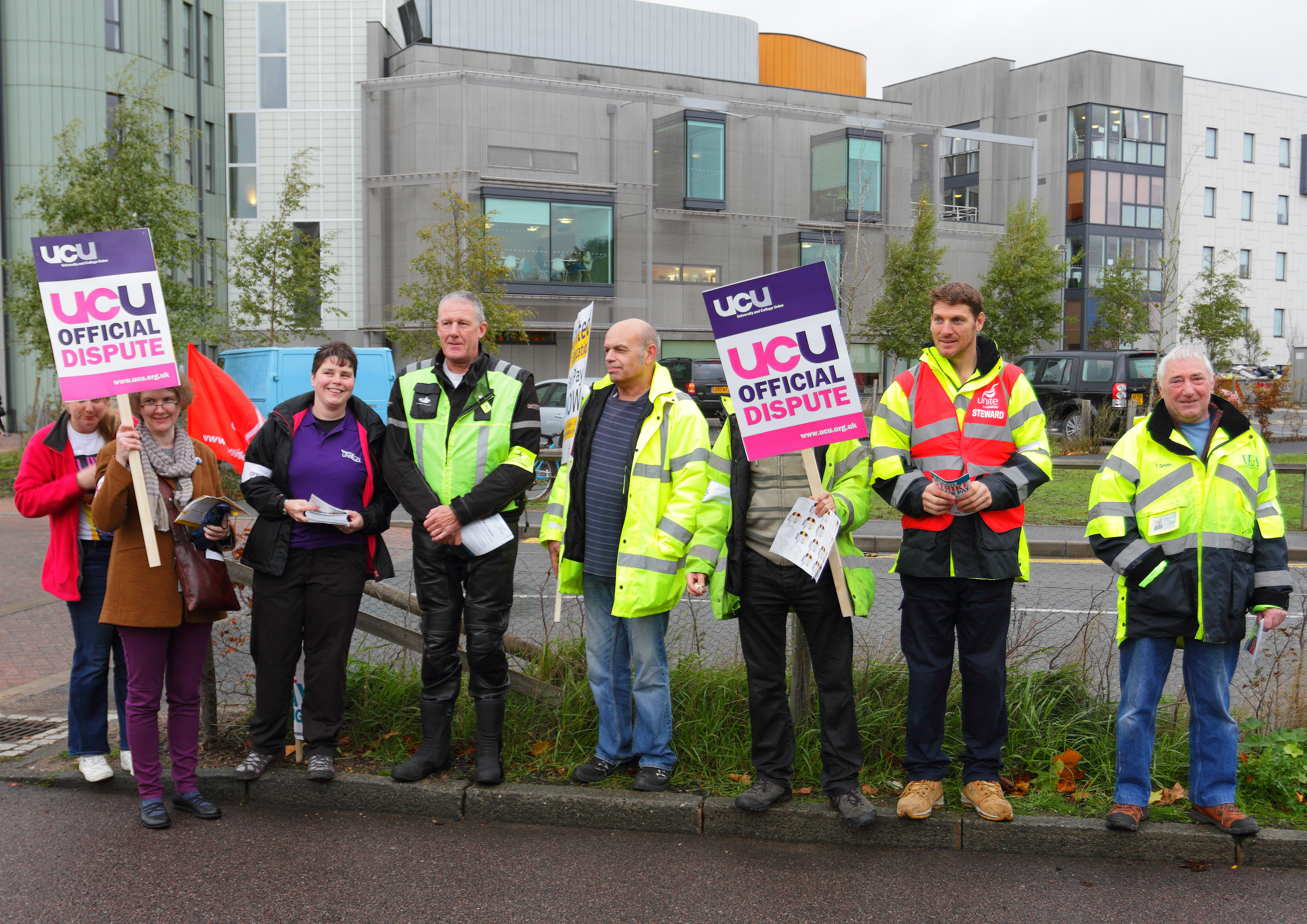
Pickets at the rear entrance to the University of East Anglia - 1 November 2013

The 2013 UK higher education strike was industrial action which took place on 31 October 2013. It was jointly co-ordinated by the UCU, Unite, and UNISON trade unions across the United Kingdom. University staff went on strike in response to a real-terms pay cut of 13% since 2008. The strike started at midnight with the mass walk-out of security guards from the Glasgow Caledonian University. Classes were cancelled at every Scottish university except the University of the Highlands and Islands.
