= International Medieval Bibliography =

Bibliographic database

- Producer: University of Leeds
- History: 1967-present
- Languages: English, French, German, Italian, Spanish

Access
- Providers: Brepols
- Cost: Subscription

Coverage
- Disciplines: Archaeology, architecture, art history, canon law, crusades, daily life, ecclesiastical history, economics, education, epigraphy, geography, hagiography, Hebrew and Jewish studies, heraldry, humanism, Islam, language, law, literature, liturgy, manuscripts and palaeography, maritime studies, medicine, military history, monasticism, music, numismatics, onomastics, philosophy, politics and diplomacy, printing history, science, social history, technology, theology, and more
- Record depth: Index and abstract
- Format coverage: Individual articles in journals, Festschriften, conference proceedings, collected essays, exhibition catalogues
- Temporal coverage: AD 300-1500
- Geospatial coverage: Europe, Middle East, North Africa
- No. of records: 560,000+ article records, 3,200+ journals

Print edition
- Print title: International Medieval Bibliography: Multidisciplinary Bibliography of the Middle Ages
- ISSN: 0020-7950

Links
- Website: www.brepolis.net

The International Medieval Bibliography (IMB) is a multidisciplinary bibliographic database covering Europe, North Africa and the Middle East for the entire period from AD 300 to 1500. It aims to provide a comprehensive, current bibliography of articles in journals and miscellany volumes (conference proceedings, essay collections or Festschriften) published worldwide in over 35 different languages. The organisation and publication of the IMB is a collaboration between the University of Leeds and the Belgian publisher Brepols.

As of 2024, the database comprised over 560,000 article records on every aspect of the Middle Ages, with over 16,000 new records being added annually in quarterly updates. A printed update of new records is published annually. The IMB's editorial staff are based at the Institute for Medieval Studies, supported by a worldwide network of academic contributors.

Around 2012, the IMB and Brepols joined forces with the Bibliographie de civilisation médiévale (BCM), based at the University of Poitiers, and it is possible to use a joint interface to search for articles in the IMB and monographs in the BCM.

== History ==
The IMB was founded in 1967 by Peter H. Sawyer, then at the University of Leeds but visiting the University of Minnesota, with the support of the Medieval Academy of America and funding from the University of Minnesota and the McKnight Foundation of Minnesota. Early volumes appeared annually and each contained around 3,000 records.

Until the 1990s, the IMB was produced and its subscriptions managed entirely at Leeds University, with printing and distribution handled by the Leeds printing house Maney. Around 1987, however, the then editor Katie Cubitt decided that the bibliography should be digitised. The Belgian publisher Brepols won the tender, publishing a digitised version of the IMB on CD in 1995, and a close relationship between the IMB, Leeds's Institute for Medieval Studies, and Brepols formed; from 1996-97 Brepols took on both online and print publication of the IMB, with data creation remaining with the Institute for Medieval Studies.

From 1995 to 2020, the IMB was home to the Bulletin of International Medieval Research, edited by Alan V. Murray. In 2020, it was announced that the Bulletin and Leeds Studies in English would merge to become Leeds Medieval Studies.

== Ethos ==
While many disciplines, such as the sciences and medicine, publish their research predominantly online and in English, a very large proportion of research in the disciplines relevant to Medieval Studies is still published in print (or print plus electronic versions) and in a wide variety of languages. The IMB aims to include publications from all disciplines and languages, focusing on those which represent the newest research and which are not separately catalogued by libraries, i.e. articles in periodicals and essays or papers in conference proceedings, Festschriften and exhibition catalogues.

The geographical scope was originally restricted to Christian Europe, but has gradually been extended to include North Africa and the Near East for the entire medieval period, so that it now also forms an important resource for the Islamic heritage as well as the cultures of Christianity, Judaism and the various European pagan religions.

== Using the IMB ==
The IMB provides a comprehensive cataloguing and indexing system to help users find articles relevant to their research. Full bibliographical details of publications covered in the IMB are given in a primary entry. In addition, each article is given a "three-dimensional" classification covering general subject (the academic discipline which best relates to its content), geographical area and century/centuries. Many articles are also provided with a brief abstract when the article title is not enough to give the reader an idea of its content. Each article is also given 3-8 keywords, which constitute a controlled vocabulary and allow enhanced search possibilities in addition to unstructured, free searches. In the user interface these index terms can be accessed in the form of browse lists. There are over 120,000 index terms, which are divided into five categories:

1. Placenames (including geographical features)
2. Medieval countries and peoples
3. Personal names (covering names of individuals, families and dynasties, modern scholars and titles of texts)
4. Keywords (e.g. agriculture, jewellery, sigillography, etc.)
5. Manuscripts and archival holdings.

Each category is treated as an authority list, which is continually being refined and expanded by the editors. A hierarchical index offers an integrated tree structure comprising some 1,500 subject terms. This allows the user to navigate from nine major conceptual areas through to the specific subject terminology employed in medieval scholarship. A parallel index of places allows step-by-step navigation from major geographical areas to over 50,000 different names of places, regions and geographical features in Europe, North Africa and the Near East. For example, users can click through from British Isles > England > West Yorkshire > Leeds > Kirkstall Abbey.

The IMB is OpenURL-compatible, so that the use of digital object identifiers (DOI) with individual article records means that users can go directly to records in a local or external library catalogue, request a copy from a document supply service or, where their library has a subscription to the publication in question, go directly to a full text version of the article. Export functionality allows users to save and refine the results of searches and so construct their own bibliographies, and email alerts can be set up for new publications which conform to users' preferred search criteria.

Details on how to subscribe to the IMB are available on the Brepols website, along with information and YouTube video tutorials on how to get started.

== Editors ==
- Peter H. Sawyer and Robert S. Hoyt, 1967-1969
- Pauline A. Stafford, 1970-1971
- Patricia Neal, 1972-1973
- Richard J. Walsh, 1974-1985
- Catherine Cubitt, 1986-1987
- Simon Forde, 1988-1995
- Alan V. Murray, 1996-2024
- Melanie Brunner, 2024-

== See also ==
- List of academic databases and search engines
