= Alan V. Murray =

Scottish historian

Alan V. Murray is a Scottish historian and philologist specializing in the history of the Crusades, the Baltic region in the Middle Ages, medieval warfare and tournaments, and Middle High German language and literature. He is a former Professor of Medieval European History at the University of Leeds and Director of the International Medieval Bibliography (IMB) and currently holds the position of Visiting Research Fellow in the School of History.

== Education ==
Murray grew up in Galashiels in the Scottish Borders, where he attended Galashiels Academy. He studied Ancient, Medieval and Modern History and German Language and Literature at the University of St Andrews, He developed his interests in the history of the crusades and Outremer with Hugh Kennedy and in medieval German literature with Jeffrey Ashcroft and William Henry Jackson, and graduated with an M.A. with First Class Honours in Medieval History and German in 1980. He worked as a Lektor at the Institut für Anglistik und Amerikanistik of the University of Erlangen-Nuremberg in 1980–1981 before returning to St Andrews to undertake a Ph.D. under Kennedy's supervision. His thesis, "Monarchy and Nobility in the Latin Kingdom of Jerusalem 1099–1131: Establishment and Origins", was completed in 1988. During his doctoral research, Murray spent 1984–1986 studying history, German and Folk Studies at the University of Freiburg in Germany.

== Career ==
In 1988, Murray joined the University of Leeds as Editorial Assistant with the International Medieval Bibliography, gaining promotion in 1990 to Assistant Editor. In 1995 Murray became Editor of the printed version of the bibliography. With his colleague Rhiannon Lawrence-Francis he oversaw its digitisation, alongside ongoing print publication, initially for publication on CD-ROM (a project completed in 2000), followed by publication online (first published 2002). In 2007 he was appointed as director of the IMB, retiring from this position in 2024. In 1995, Murray founded the journal Bulletin of International Medieval Research. It later merged with Leeds Studies in English to become Leeds Medieval Studies, of which Murray was also an editor; the first volume of the new journal was published in 2021.

Alongside his bibliographic and editorial work at Leeds, Murray developed his role as a teacher and researcher. He first appears in the University of Leeds Calendar on the board of studies of the Leeds Centre for Medieval Studies (now Institute for Medieval Studies) for the academic year 1990–91. He became Lecturer in Medieval Studies in 2004, advancing to Senior Lecturer, and becoming Professor of Medieval European History in 2023. In collaboration with the Royal Armouries, he led development of teaching and research on medieval tournaments at Leeds. He retired in 2026.

== Research ==
Murray's earliest research was on the composition of the First Crusade (1096–1099) and the early history of the Frankish principalities of Outremer, and was especially informed by prosopographical and pragmatic approaches. He later became interested in the history of the Baltic region, and edited three collections of essays bringing together work by historians in Estonia, Latvia, Denmark, Sweden, Finland, Germany, Russia, the United Kingdom, the US, and Canada. In 2011, he received the Vilis Vitols Award, bestowed annually by the Association for the Advancement of Baltic Studies for the best article published in the Journal of Baltic Studies. His biography of Baldwin of Bourcq, count of Edessa and king of Jerusalem (published 2022), won the J. F. Verbruggen Prize, awarded by De Re Militari: The Society for Medieval Military History "for the best book on medieval military history published within the prior three years". His research on German language and literature includes studies on the Nibelungenlied, Ulrich von Liechtenstein, Reinbot von Durne, Konrad von Würzburg, Wernher der Gartenaere, the Livonian Rhymed Chronicle and the Chronicle of Zimmern. In recent years he has carried out research on the works of Walter Scott and James Hogg. He is a Fellow of the Royal Historical Society (FRHistS), a Fellow of the Society of Antiquaries of Scotland (FSAScot) and an elected member of the Baltische Historische Kommission. In December 2025 he received an honorary doctorate from the University of Tartu in recognition of his research and editorial work in Estonian history. He writes in English and German; several of his publications have also been translated into Estonian, Dutch, Slovene, Spanish and Turkish.

== Major works ==
=== Author ===
- Murray, Alan V. (2000). The Crusader Kingdom of Jerusalem: A Dynastic History 1099–1125. Occasional Publications of the Linacre Unit for Prosopographical Research, 4. Oxford (GB): Prosopographica et Genealogica. ISBN 978-1-900934-03-9.
- Murray, Alan V. (2015). The Franks in Outremer: Studies in the Latin Principalities of Palestine and Syria, 1099–1187. Variorum Collected Studies Series, CS1056. Farnham: Ashgate. ISBN 978-1-47246885-7.
- Murray, Alan V. (2022). Baldwin of Bourcq: Count of Edessa and King of Jerusalem (1100–1131). Rulers of the Latin East. New York: Routledge. ISBN 978-1-000-47980-5.

=== Editor ===
- Forde, Simon; Johnson, Lesley; Murray, Alan V., eds. (1995). Concepts of National Identity in the Middle Ages. Leeds Texts and Monographs. New series, 14. Leeds: Leeds Studies in English. ISBN 0902296248.
- Murray, Alan V., ed. (1998). From Clermont to Jerusalem: The Crusades and Crusader Societies, 1095–1500. Selected Proceedings of the International Medieval Congress, University of Leeds, 10–13 July 1995. International Medieval Research, 3. Turnhout: Brepols. ISBN 2503506674.
- Murray, Alan V., ed. (2001). Crusade and Conversion on the Baltic Frontier, 1150–1500. Aldershot, England; Burlington, VT: Ashgate. ISBN 978-0-7546-0325-2.
- Murray, Alan V., ed. (2009). The Clash of Cultures on the Medieval Baltic Frontier. Farnham, England; Burlington, VT: Ashgate. ISBN 978-0-7546-6483-3. OCLC 310096942.
- Murray, Alan V., ed. (2006). The Crusades: An Encyclopedia. Vol. 4. Santa Barbara, California: ABC-CLIO. ISBN 1576078620.
- Rider, Jeff; Murray, Alan V., eds. (2009). Galbert of Bruges and the Historiography of Medieval Flanders. Washington, D.C: Catholic University of America Press. ISBN 978-0-8132-1719-2. OCLC 317623420.
- Murray, Alan V., ed. (2014). The North-Eastern Frontiers of Medieval Europe: The Expansion of Latin Christendom in the Baltic Lands. The expansion of Latin Europe, 1000–1500, 4. Farnham: Ashgate Variorum. ISBN 9781409436805.
- Murray, Alan V., ed. (2015). The Crusades to the Holy Land: The Essential Reference Guide. Santa Barbara, California: ABC-CLIO, LLC. ISBN 978-1-61069-779-8.
- Murray, Alan V.; Watts, Karen, eds. (2020). The Medieval Tournament as Spectacle: Tourneys, Jousts and pas d'armes, 1100–1600. Royal Armouries Research Series, 1. Woodbridge: Boydell. ISBN 978-1-78327-542-7.
- Selart, Anti; Murray, Alan V., eds. (2025). Medieval Livonia: History, Society and Economy of a Territory on the Baltic Frontier. Outremer, 18. Turnhout: Brepols. ISBN 978-2-503-57806-4.

=== Database ===
- Riley-Smith, J. S. C.; Phillips, Jonathan; Murray, Alan V.; Perry, Guy; Morton, Nicholas (2016). "A Database of Crusaders to the Holy Land, 1095–1149". The Digital Humanities Institute, University of Sheffield.
