= Meg Twycross =

UK historian and medievalist

Meg Twycross FSA
- Occupations: Historian; Academic

Academic background
- Education: Somerville College, Oxford (BLitt MA)

Academic work
- Discipline: History
- Sub-discipline: Medieval history; Medieval theatre
- Institutions: Worcester College, Oxford; St Edmund Hall, Oxford; Lancaster University

Margaret "Meg" Ann Twycross FSA is a literary scholar and historian specialising in medieval theatre and iconography. She is Emeritus Professor at Lancaster University.

== Career ==
After a Quaker childhood spent in Lancashire, Trinidad, and Barking (Essex), Twycross went to Somerville College, Oxford. After time spent living in Chile and the Arabian Gulf, she returned to Oxford as college lecturer at both Worcester College and St Edmund Hall before, in 1974, moving to Lancaster University where she has been for the rest of her academic career.

She is particularly interested in the practicalities of medieval staging, and the way in which what the audience sees contributes to the message of the plays. Performance research from 1969 onward has seen her productions in original venues, from the streets of York and Chester to Great Halls in colleges and country houses. She is Executive Editor of the journal Medieval English Theatre.

Her 2002 book with Sarah Carpenter Masks and Masking in Medieval and Early Tudor England won the 2004 Bevington Award for Best New Book from the Medieval and Renaissance Drama Society. An early interest in humanities computing and the presentation of material on screen was reflected in her teaching and the construction of websites, which include The Journeys of George Fox 1652-1653. She was elected as a Fellow of the Society of Antiquaries of London on 11 November 2014.

== Select publications ==
- Twycross, Meg (2017), The Materials of Early Theatre: Sources, Images, and Performance, Shifting Paradigms in Early English Drama Studies: Variorum Collected Studies, London: Routledge, ISBN 9780367593773
- Twycross, Meg (2015), "'They did not come out of an Abbey in Lancashire': Francis Douce and the manuscript of the Towneley Plays", Medieval English Theatre, 37: 149–165
- Twycross, Meg (2012), "The Ladies of Bohemia and the Party Friar: An Allegorical cast List from the Early Tudor Revel", Nottingham Medieval Studies, 56: 399–420, doi:10.1484/J.NMS.1.102766
- Twycross, Meg (2011), "'Say thy lesson, fool': Idleness tries to teach Ignorance to read", Medieval English Theatre, 33: 75–121
- Twycross, Meg (2010), "'Neque vox neque sensus': The Resuscitation of Wit in 'Wit and Science'", Medieval English Theatre, 32: 81–115
- Twycross, Meg (2007), "Medieval Theatre: Codes and Genres", in Brown, Peter (ed.), A Companion to Medieval English Literature and Culture c.1350-c.1500, Blackwell Companions to Literature & Culture, Oxford: Wiley-Blackwell, ISBN 978-1596931138
- Twycross, Meg (2006), "The Theatre", in Sawyer, J.F.A. (ed.), The Blackwell Companion to the Bible and Culture, Oxford: Wiley-Blackwell, ISBN 978-0-470-67488-8
- Twycross, Meg (2005), "Forget the 4.30 am Start: Recovering a Palimpsest in the York Ordo Paginarum", Medieval English Theatre, 25: 98–152
- Twycross, Meg; Jones, M.; Fletcher, A.J. (2002), "'Fart prike in cule': the pictures", Medieval English Theatre, 23: 100–121
- Twycross, Meg; Carpenter, Sarah (2002), Masks and Masking in Medieval and Early Tudor England, London: Ashgate Publishing, ISBN 9781138257856
