= Records of Early English Drama =

International research project

- Funding agency: University of Toronto
- Sponsors: British Academy; Social Sciences and Humanities Research Council
- Partners: Simon Fraser University; Victoria College, Toronto
- Duration: 1976 – present
- Website: ereed.org

Records of Early English Drama (REED) is a performance history research project, based at the University of Toronto in Ontario, Canada. It was founded in 1976 by a group of international scholars interested in understanding “the native tradition of English playmaking that apparently flourished in late medieval provincial towns” and formed the context for the development of the English Renaissance theatre, including the work of Shakespeare and his contemporaries. REED's primary focus is to locate, transcribe, edit, and publish historical documents from England, Wales, and Scotland containing evidence of drama, secular music, and other communal entertainment and mimetic ceremony from the late Middle Ages until 1642, when the Puritans closed the London public theatres.

From its inception in 1976 to 2016, REED published twenty-seven print collections of records edited by over thirty international scholars. REED is also engaged in creating a collection of free digital resources for research and education including Patrons and Performances (2003) and Early Modern London Theatres (2011). In March 2017, REED moved to digital publication of records with the launch of REED Online, a publication site where records will be freely available.

== History ==
During a 1970-71 research trip in York, England, to study manuscripts related to the York cycle of biblical plays (also known as the York Mystery Plays), Alexandra F. Johnston, an early drama scholar from the University of Toronto, came across a manuscript transcription of a 1433 indenture agreement between the leaders of the medieval Mercers' Guild and their pageant masters. The document contained details of a medieval pageant wagon and sophisticated staging unknown to researchers of the time. Johnston also met Margaret Dorrell, an Australian graduate student at the University of Leeds, who was working on a similar project related to the York records; the two women decided to collaborate.

Within the next two years, Johnston and Dorrell met other scholars of medieval and Renaissance drama working independently on manuscripts from other English cities (David Galloway of the University of New Brunswick on Norwich, Reginald Ingram of the University of British Columbia on Coventry, and Lawrence Clopper of Indiana University Bloomington on Chester). The idea of a scholarly publishing project to find, transcribe, and edit documentary evidence of performance arose from these meetings and was met with interest by the individual researchers and their academic communities.

In January 1974, Johnston circulated a position paper on the project. Discussions and planning followed and, in February 1975, the inaugural REED meeting was held at Victoria University in the University of Toronto. In 1975–76, Johnston received a Canada Council personal grant for the publication of the York records as a pilot project, and in late 1976, REED was officially launched with a Canada Council ten-year Major Editorial Grant for the proposed series of collections, establishing REED as a long-term research and publishing project. Because three of the four initial collections were edited by Canadian researchers, Toronto, Canada, became the home of the project.

In 1979, REED published its first two collections of records: York, edited by Alexandra F. Johnston and Margaret Rogerson (née Dorrell), and Chester, edited by Lawrence D. Clopper. Since then the project has expanded its scope from major cities and towns to all the counties of England, Wales, and Scotland, based on historic pre-1642 county borders.

After its inception in 1976, REED produced the bi-annual REED Newsletter which, in 1997, became the refereed scholarly journal Early Theatre.

=== Organization and Structure ===
The REED project is run by a core team, led by a managing editor, often with other associate editors or temporary staff. The work is overseen by an Executive Board consisting of early drama researchers, historians, digital humanities experts, and other invited collaborators. Historically, the series has also had a Director of Research and General Editor in the person of Sally-Beth MacLean. The executive board has had members such as John Craig, Mark Chambers, Matthew_Davies, James Cummings, Peter Greenfield, Diane Jakacki, Alexandra F. Johnston, Naomi Morgenstern, Sally-Beth MacLean, C.E. McGee, Alan H. Nelson, Matthew Sergi, and Paul Whitfield White.

=== Partnerships and collaborations ===
REED has had close ties to the Department of English in the Faculty of Arts and Science, the University of Toronto Mississauga, the Centre for Medieval Studies (CMS), the Centre for Reformation and Renaissance Studies (CRRS), and the Graduate Centre for Study of Drama. From 1976 to 2009 the project was based at Victoria University in the University of Toronto. In 2009 the offices of the project moved to the English Department. REED retains active relationships with the English Department, the CMS, and the University of Toronto Libraries. REED's internal governance is provided by an executive board of senior scholars in early drama and related fields, with digital advisors and collections editors drawn from Canada, the United States, Australia, New Zealand, and the United Kingdom.

REED has collaborated with the Poculi Ludique Societas (PLS) to mount multiple productions of full cycles of medieval biblical dramas: the York Plays (also called the York Mystery Plays) in 1977, 1998, and 2025, and the Chester Plays (also called the Chester Mystery Plays) in 1983 and 2010, with participation from international amateur theatre groups.

In November 2002, REED, in partnership with the Art Gallery of Ontario, hosted the Picturing Shakespeare symposium, an exhibition of and an accompanying public symposium regarding the Sanders portrait, an Elizabethan painting reputed to be the only one of Shakespeare made during his lifetime.

In addition to revealing evidence of vernacular entertainment activities, the research work for the collections produces a body of knowledge regarding professional travelling entertainers, their patronage, and their performance venues. This cumulative information was first launched for public use through the Patrons and Performances website in 2003.

In 2011, REED collaborated with the Department of Digital Humanities, King's College London, and the Department of English at the University of Southampton to create Early Modern London Theatres (EMLoT), a research database and educational resource, with learning modules. EMLoT gathers documents related to professional theatres north and south of the Thames up to 1642 and bibliographic information about their subsequent transcriptions, documenting how scholars “got [their] information about the early theatres, from whom and when.”

In 2016, to mark the 400th anniversary of Shakespeare's death, REED collaborated with the BBC and The British Library to produce an ongoing public website titled Shakespeare on Tour. Many REED editors contributed stories and images from their research in the Elizabethan period to help raise “the curtain on performances of The Bard’s plays countrywide from the 16th Century to the present day.”

=== Publications ===
Throughout its existence, REED has maintained its primary focus and published about six collections each decade. A full list of its collections, print and digital are available on its website at https://ereed.org/reedcollections. In 2015, REED published its last print collection (Civic London to 1558, edited by Anne Lancashire), and in March 2017, the first digital collection (Staffordshire, edited by Alan B. Somerset) was made freely available on its publication website, REED Online. All subsequent collections have been added to this database and website.

=== Funding ===
Although over the years REED has received substantial funding from private individuals and foundations (including the Jackman Foundation), the Canada Council, and the Social Sciences and Humanities Research Council in Canada; the National Endowment for the Humanities and the Andrew W. Mellon Foundation in the U.S.; as well as the Arts and Humanities Research Council and The British Academy in the U.K. it still relies on funding and donations to carry on its mission.
