= Northern History =

- Discipline: History
- Language: English

Publication details
- History: 1966–present
- Publisher: Taylor & Francis
- Frequency: Biannual

Standard abbreviations
- ISO 4: North. Hist.

Indexing
- ISSN: 0078-172X (print); 1745-8706 (web)
- LCCN: 70000649

Links
- Journal homepage

Northern History is an academic journal of the history of the northern counties of England. It was first published in 1966 under the auspices of the School of History, University of Leeds. It is indexed by Scopus. The journal's founding editor was G. C. F. Forster, and the first issue was 'facilitated by a guarantee from the publications fund of the University of Leeds, and by donations from local firms and individuals'. Forster retired from the journal after the publication of issue 53.2. In 1997, S. J. D. Green (Professor of Modern History at the University of Leeds) joined as co-editor. In 2016, the Editorial team changed to: Green, Julia Barrow FBA (Professor in Medieval Studies) and Stephen Alford (Professor of Early Modern British History). From September 2022 to March 2024, the editor was Julia Barrow. From March 2024, the editors are Julia Barrow and Peter Maw (Associate Professor of Eighteenth-Century History at the University of Leeds). The journal is currently published by Routledge.

The journal's purpose is to publish scholarly work on the history of the seven historic Northern counties of England: Cheshire, Cumberland, Durham, Lancashire, Northumberland, Westmorland and Yorkshire. Since it was launched it has always been a refereed journal, attracting articles on Northern subjects from historians in many parts of the world. The journal runs the annual 'Gordon Forster Essay Prize'.
