= Arthur Clare Cawley =

English scholar at the University of Leeds

- First edition cover of Everyman, which Cawley edited
- Born: 21 November 1913; Kent, England
- Died: 7 January 1993 (aged 79); Brisbane, Queensland, Australia
- Education: University College London
- Occupation: Academic
- Spouse: Winifred Cawley (m. 1939)

Arthur Clare Cawley (21 November 1913 – 7 January 1993) was Professor of English Language and Medieval English Literature at the University of Leeds.

== Early life and education ==
Cawley was born in the Medway district of Kent on 21 November 1913.

In 1934, he graduated from University College London.

== Academic career ==
After a year in the Education Department at the University of Hull, Cawley returned to UCL in 1935 for three years as a part-time Lecturer during which time he completed his MA on John of Trevisa's version of Ralph Higden's Polychronicon.

In 1938, Cawley went to Harvard on a Commonwealth Fellowship and, on his return to England, joined the British Council. He went as Professor of English to Iași in Romania until the German invasion forced him to leave and he spent 1941 to 1945 in Egypt and in Benghazi, Libya. Finally, still with the British Council, he taught in Reykjavík, Iceland.

In 1946 Cawley returned to England and after a year at the University of Sheffield was appointed to a Lectureship at the University of Leeds in 1947. He completed his PhD in 1952. His thesis for the University of London was a scholarly edition of six of the thirty-six Wakefield Pageants.

In 1959 Cawley left Leeds to go to the Darnell Chair of English at the University of Queensland, Australia. He remained there for six years before returning to Leeds as Professor of English Language and Medieval English Literature in 1965. He retired from his chair in 1979 with the title Emeritus Professor. As of 2009, the university offered a post-graduate scholarship in his name.

A noted Mediaevalist, Cawley has commentated and edited numerous works including "Everyman", mediaeval miracle plays, the Canterbury Tales, and the Wakefield Mystery Plays.

== Marriage ==
Cawley married fellow University College London postgraduate student Winifred Cozens (1915 - 2001) in 1939. Winifred was a teacher and children's author.

== Death ==
Cawley died in Brisbane, Australia on 7 January 1993 at the age of 79.
