= Olympe Aguado =

Franco-Spanish photographer and socialite

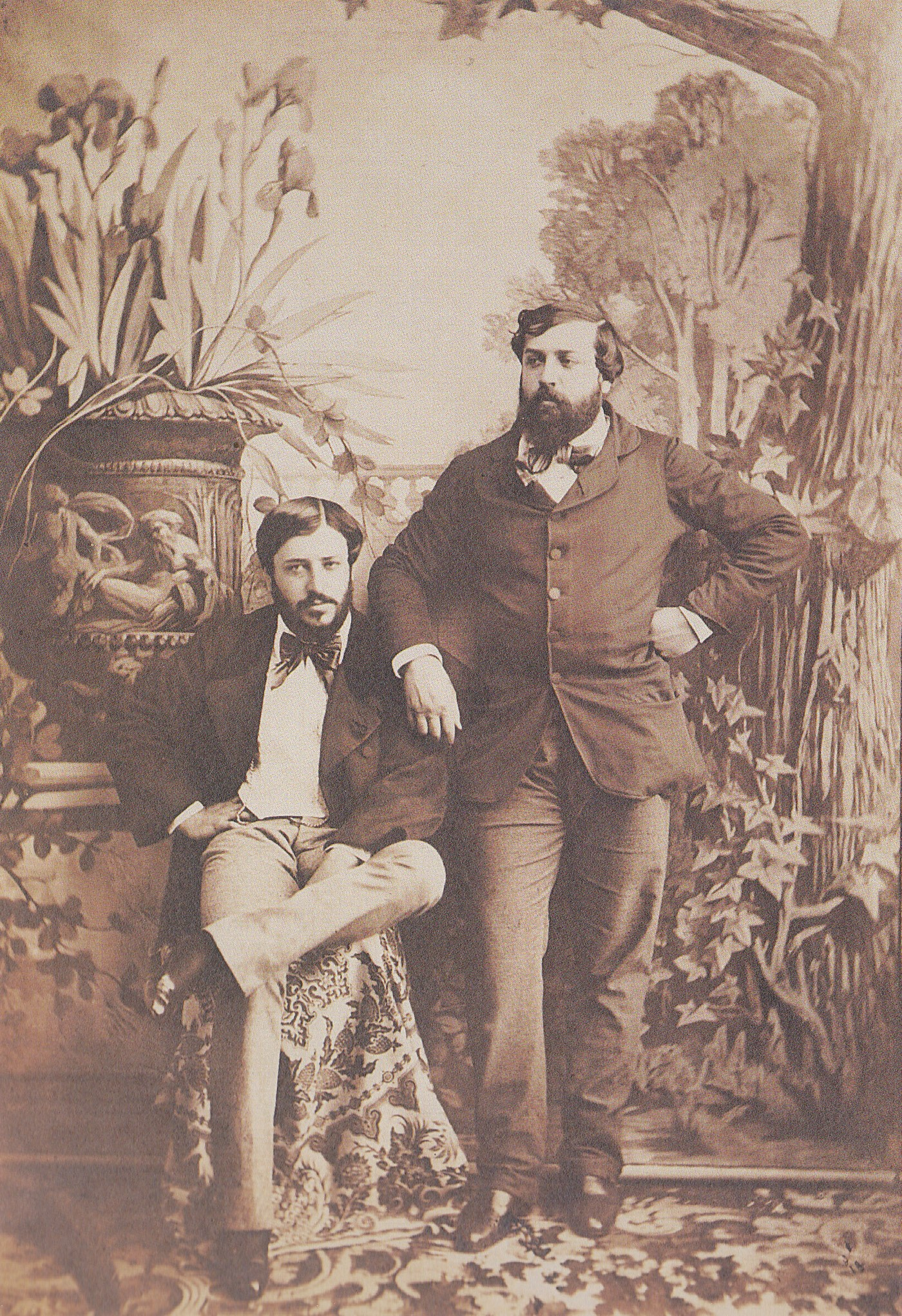
- Olympe Aguado (right, standing), with his brother, Onésipe, c. 1853
- Born: 3 February 1827; Paris, France
- Died: 25 October 1894 (aged 67); Compeigne, France
- Parent(s): Alejandro Aguado, 1st Marquess of Marismas del Guadalquivir; Maria de Carmen Vidoire Moreno
- Relatives: Onésipe Aguado (brother)

Count Olympe-Clemente-Alexandre-Auguste Aguado (3 February 1827 – 25 October 1894) was a Franco-Spanish photographer and socialite, active primarily in the 1850s and 1860s. One of several early photographers who learned the practice from Gustave Le Gray, Aguado pioneered a number of photographic processes, including carte de visite photographs and photographic enlargement processes. He was also a founding member of the influential French Photographic Society in 1854.

== Life ==
Aguado was born in Paris in 1827, the second son of the 1st Marquess of Marismas del Guadalquivir (1784–1842) and Maria de Carmen Vidoire Moreno. His father had been a supporter of Joseph Bonaparte during the Peninsular War (1808-1814). Following the war, he went into exile in Paris, and rose to become one of the wealthiest bankers in France. In the 1820s and 1830s, he negotiated a series of loans that saved Spain from bankruptcy, and King Ferdinand VII of Spain conferred on him the title of Marquess of Marismas del Guadalquivir. Upon his death, his sons, including Olympe, inherited a considerable fortune.

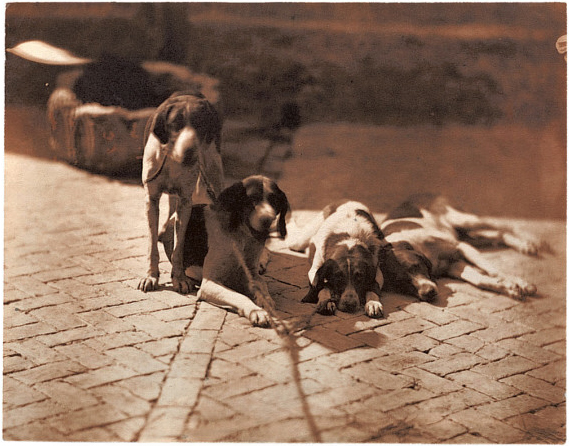
Hunting Dogs

In the late 1840s, Aguado learned photography from pioneering French photographer Gustave Le Gray. From his studio on the Place Vendôme, he initially worked with daguerreotypes, but by the early 1850s, was already experimenting with other photographic processes, namely with negative paper and collodion on glass. In 1854, he and Edouard Delessert developed the carte-de-visite printing method as a way to add portraits to visiting cards (the process was patented by Eugène Disderi later that year). Later in the decade, he experimented with enlargement processes. Like Le Gray, Aguado taught photography to a number of his friends, among them Camille Silvy.

Aguado was a member of the early French photographic organization, the Société héliographique, in the early 1850s. In 1854, he was a founding member the Société héliographique's more inclusive successor, the French Photographic Society (Société française de photographie). This organization would prove influential in subsequent decades in the development and promotion of photography in France. Aguado frequently served as a judge for the Society's exhibitions during the 1850s and 1860s.

Aguado was a frequent figure at the court of Emperor Napoleon III, and photographed both the emperor and his wife, Eugénie. Aguado's photographs during this period included a number of staged portraits that poked fun at the mores and habits of Second Empire nobility. By the end of the 1860s, Aguado had largely lost interest in photography, and produced few photographs in subsequent decades. He died in Compeigne in 1894.

Olympe's younger brother, Onésipe (1830–1893), was also a photographer, and the two collaborated on a number of projects. A nephew of Olympe Aguado, Henry Tenre, was a noted early-20th-century painter.

== Works ==
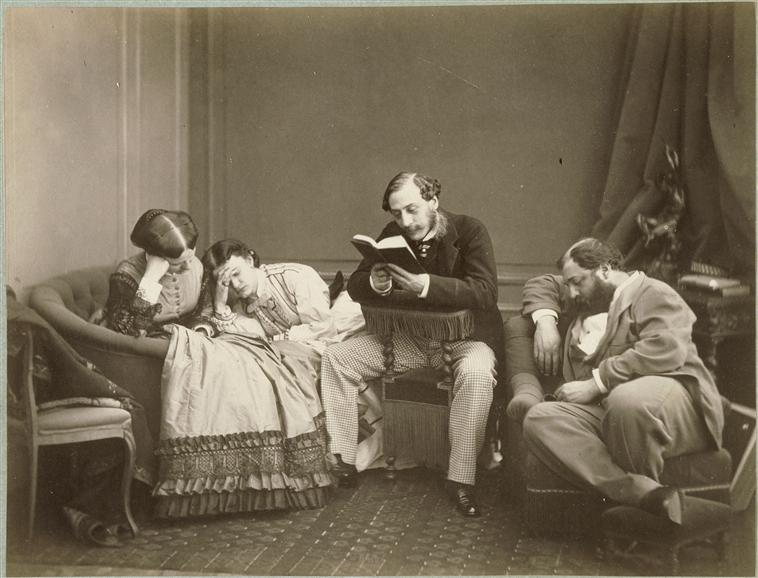
La Lecture

Most of Aguado's photographs consist of landscapes (especially trees, rivers, and pastoral scenes) and portraits. He had a penchant for experimenting with new photographic processes, and thus produced photographs using numerous different mediums. Surviving Aguado daguerreotypes include Intérieur d'un hôtel particulier, which depicts the interior of a large house. Salt paper prints by Aguado include Still Life with Garden Equipment (1855) and Study of Trees, Bois de Boulogne (1855). He initially preferred collodion on glass for portraits, but later switched to albumen prints. No known examples of Aguado's enlargement experiments have survived.

Some of Aguado's most interesting images consist of a series of staged family portraits, or "living pictures," taken in the 1860s as an apparent critique of Second Empire nobility. The most well-known of these include Admiration, which depicts several people with their backs turned to the camera admiring a painting, and La Lecture, which depicts a man reading to a bored audience (some of whom are falling asleep).

Aguado's photographs are included in the collections of the Getty Museum, the Musée d'Orsay, the French Photographic Society, and the Strasbourg Museum of Modern and Contemporary Art.

== Gallery ==
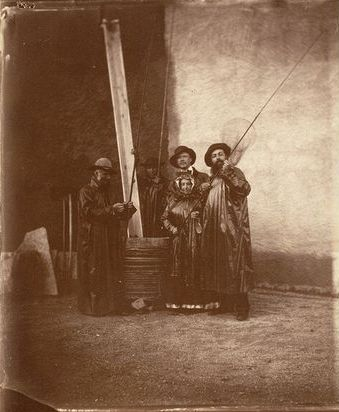
The Artist, His Mother, and Friends in Fishing Garb

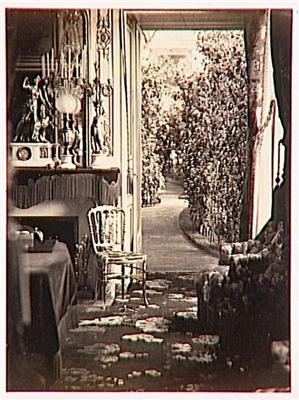
Chateau de Sivry interior

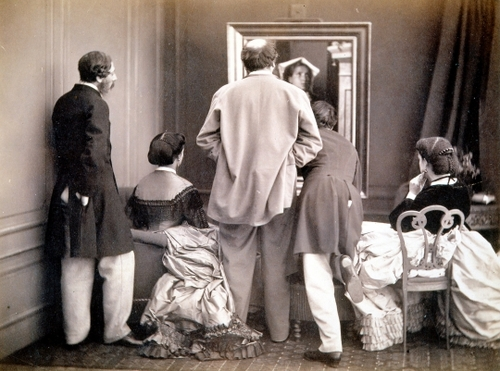
Admiration

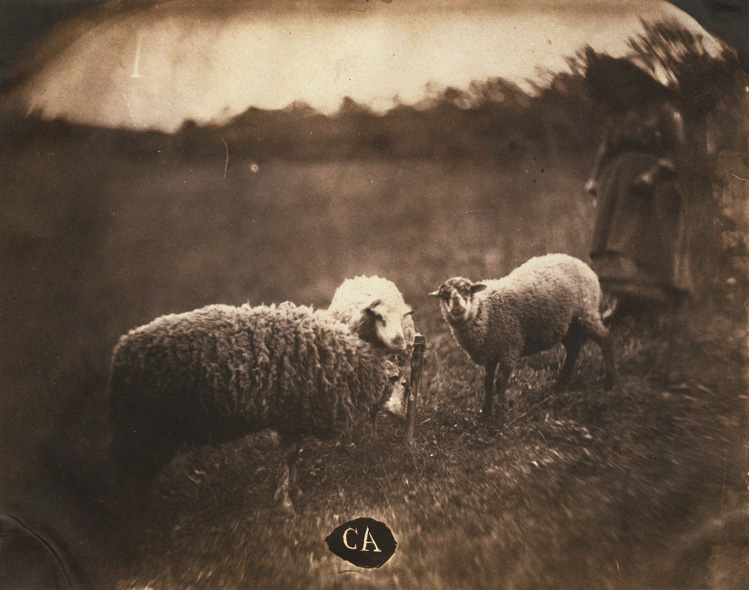
An early pastoral scene
