= Maxime Du Camp =

French writer and photographer (1822–1894)

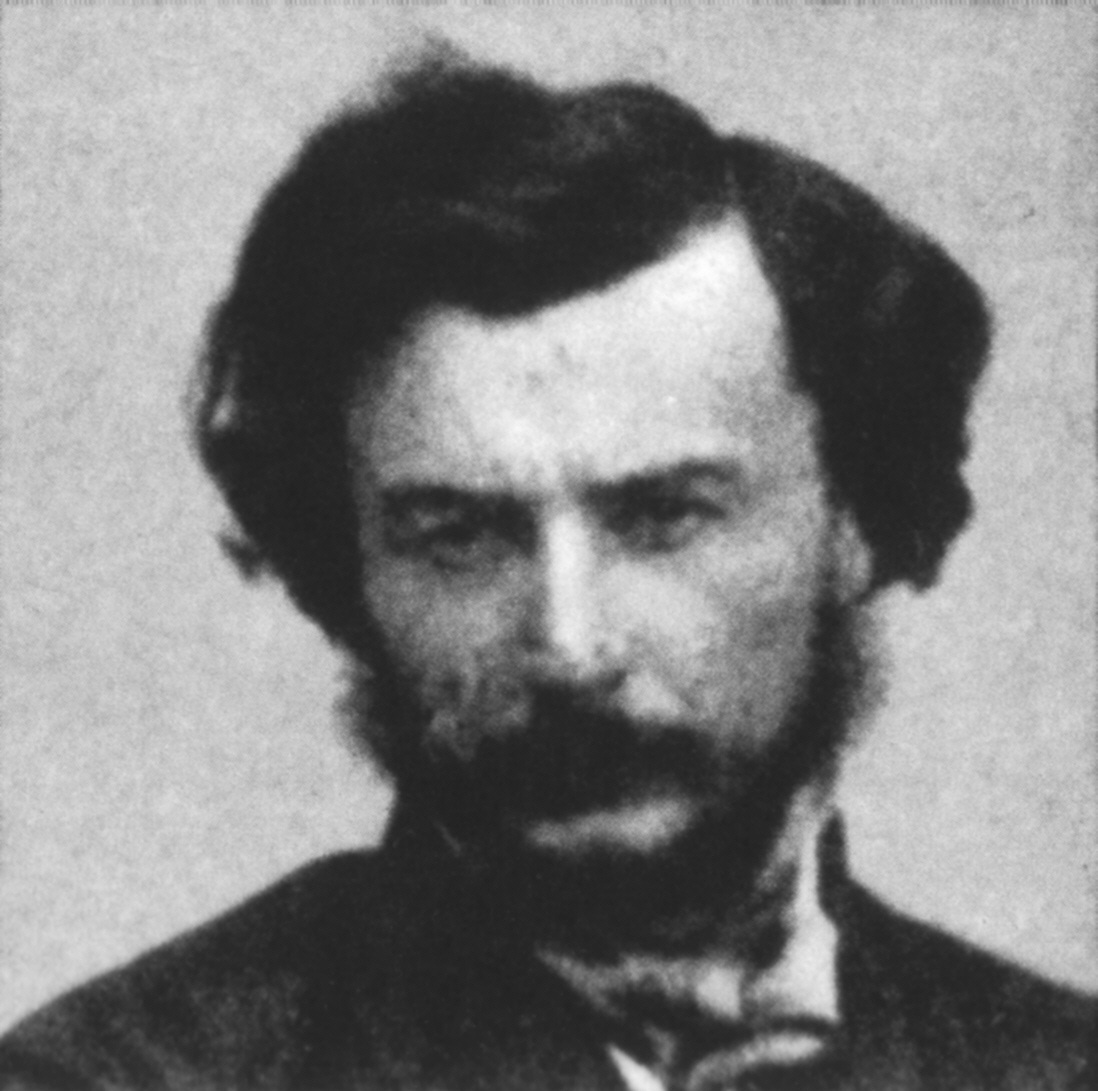
- Maxime Du Camp (between 1850 and 1870)
- Born: Maxime Du Camp; 8 February 1822; Paris, France
- Died: 9 February 1894 (aged 72); Baden-Baden, German Empire
- Resting place: Montmartre Cemetery
- Occupations: Writer and photographer
- Movement: Realism and Late Romanticism

Maxime Du Camp (8 February 1822 – 9 February 1894) was a French writer and photographer.

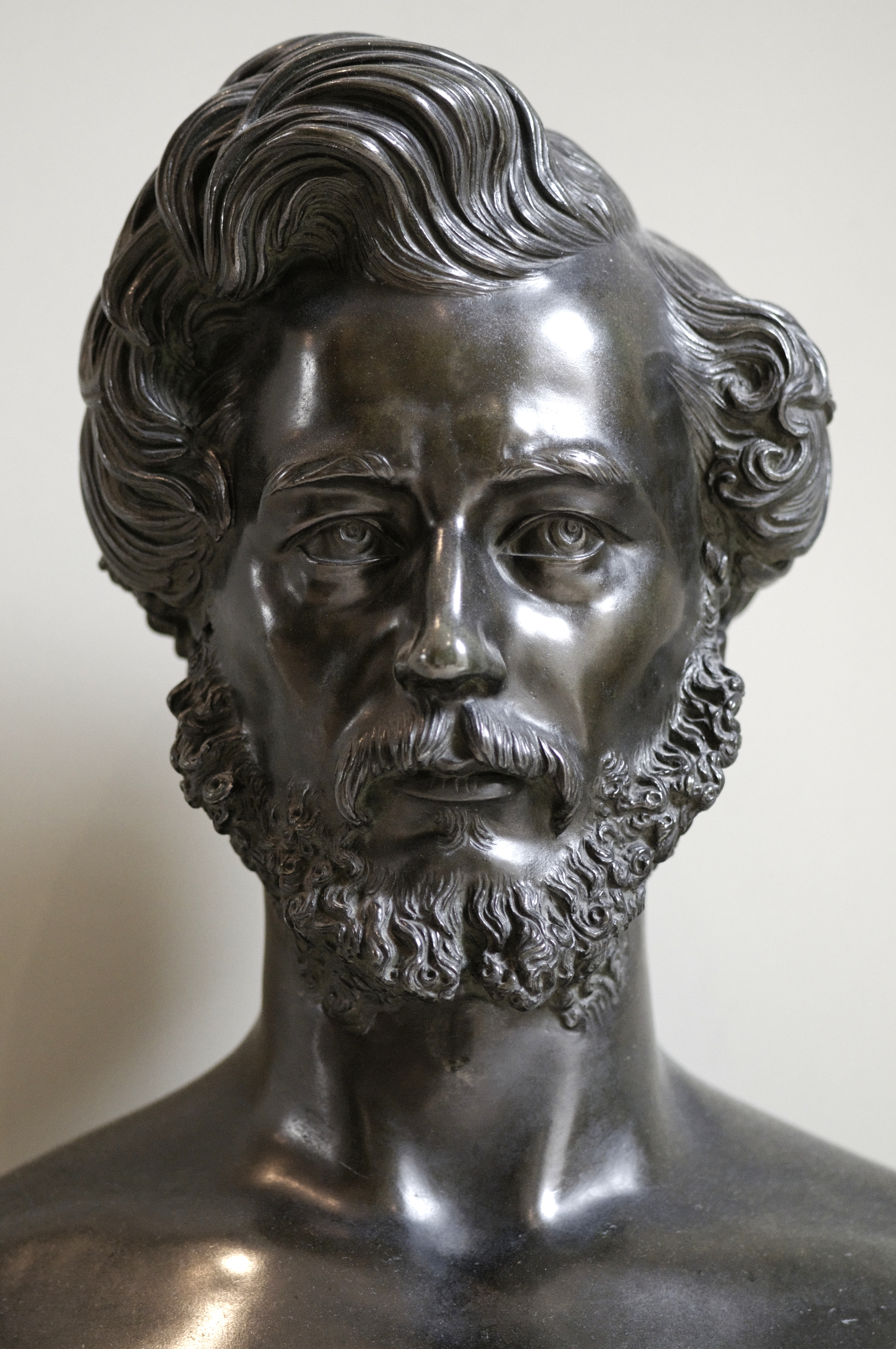
Bust of Maxime Du Camp.

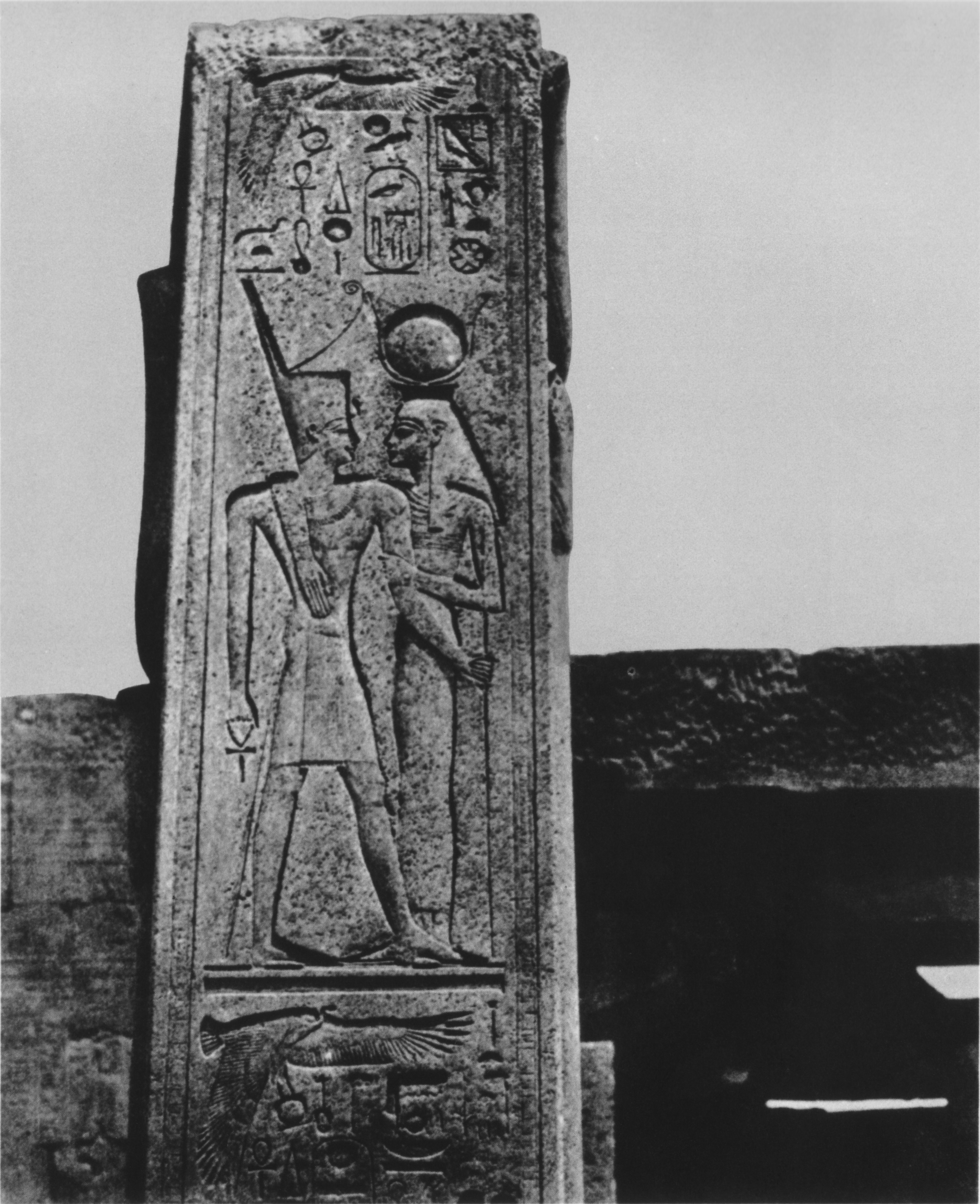
Stele of Karnak, Egypt, about 1850. Photo taken by Du Camp

== Biography ==
Born in Paris, Du Camp was the son of a successful surgeon. After finishing college, he indulged in his strong desire for travel, thanks to his father's assets. Du Camp traveled in Europe and the East between 1844 and 1845, and again between 1849 and 1851 in company with Gustave Flaubert. After his return, Du Camp wrote about his traveling experiences. Flaubert also wrote about his experiences with Maxime.

In 1851, Du Camp became a founder of the Revue de Paris (suppressed in 1858), in which his friend Flaubert's Madame Bovary was first published in serialised form in 1856, as well as a frequent contributor to the Revue des deux mondes. In 1853, he became an officer of the Legion of Honour. Serving as a volunteer with Garibaldi in his 1860 conquest of the Kingdom of the Two Sicilies, Du Camp recounted his experiences in Expédition des deux Siciles (1861). In 1870 he was nominated for the senate, but his election was frustrated by the downfall of the Empire. He was elected a member of the Académie française in 1880, mainly, it is said, on account of his history of the Commune, published under the title of Les Convulsions de Paris (1878–1880).

Du Camp was an early amateur photographer who learned the craft from Gustave Le Gray shortly prior to departing on his 1849–1859 trip to Egypt. His travel books were among the first to be illustrated with photographs.

Du Camp, the most famous traveller of his time, was the dedicatee of the final poem, Le Voyage, written in 1859, from Baudelaire's Les Fleurs du Mal. Du Camp's 1855 poetry collection, Les Chants Modernes, includes a poem titled Le Voyageur. Baudelaire's original title for Le Voyage was Les Voyageurs. The original title has obvious echoes of Du Camp’s poem.

Maxime Du Camp died in 1894 and was buried in the Cimetière de Montmartre in the Montmartre Quarter of Paris.

== Works ==
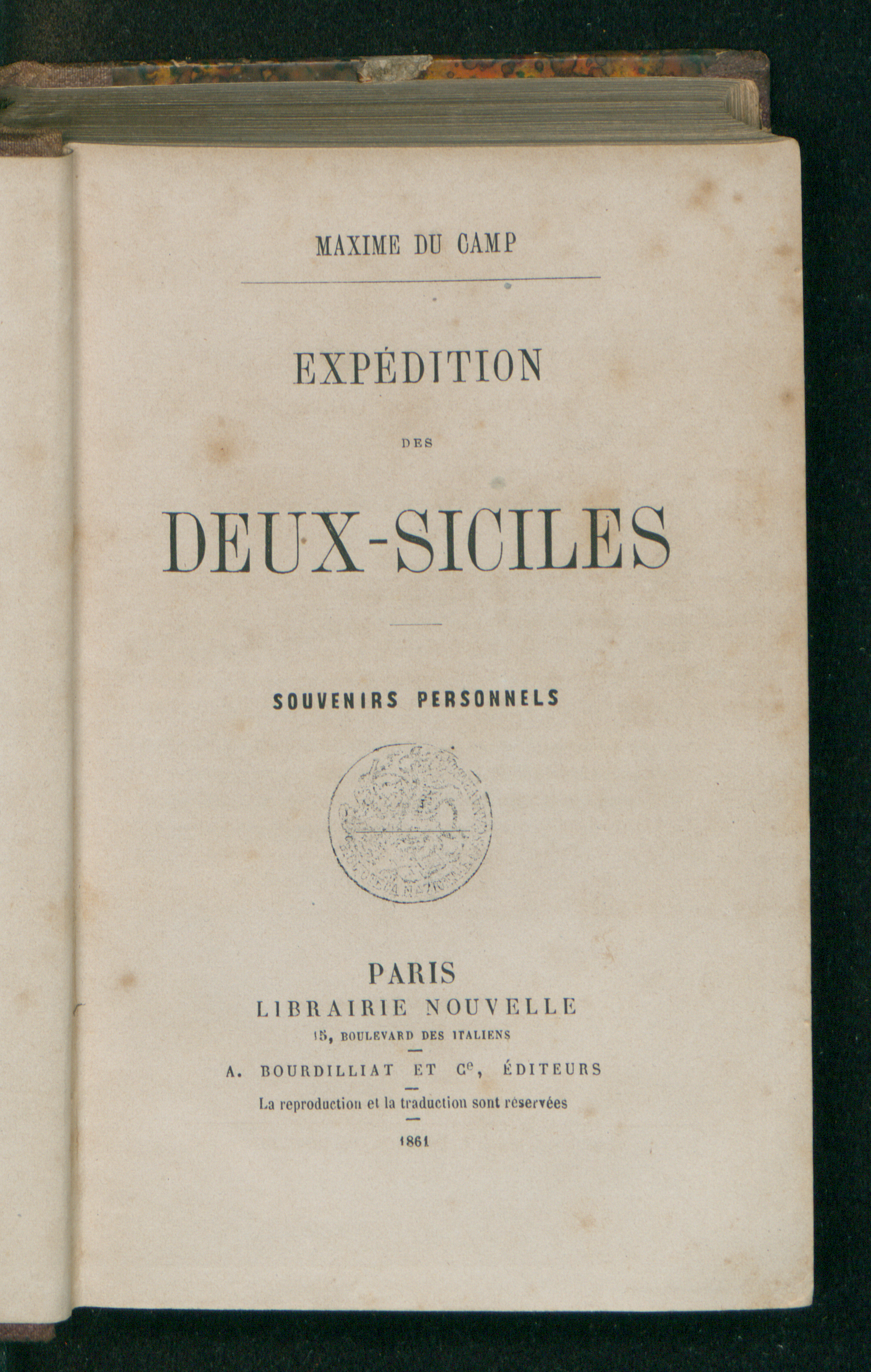
Expédition des Deux-Siciles, 1861

- Chants modernes (1855)
- Convictions (1858)

Works on travel:

- Souvenirs et paysages d'orient (1848)
- Egypte, Nubie, Palestine, Syrie (1852)

Works of art criticism:

- Les Salons de 1857, 1859, 1861

Novels:

- L'Homme au bracelet d'or (1862)
- Une histoire d'amour (1889)

Literary studies:

- Théophile Gautier (1890)

Du Camp authored a valuable 6-volume book on the daily life of Paris, Paris, ses organes, ses fonctions, sa vie dans la seconde moitié du XIX^{e} siècle (1869–1875). He published several works on social questions, one of which, the Auteurs de mon temps, was to be kept sealed in the Bibliothèque Nationale until 1910. His Souvenirs littéraires (2 vols., 1882–1883) contain much information about contemporary writers, especially Gustave Flaubert, of whom Du Camp was an early and intimate friend. In 1878, he published an account of the Paris Commune called Les Convulsions de Paris, drawing from articles on the subject he had written for the Revue des deux mondes.
