= Gustave Le Gray =

French photographer (1820–1884)

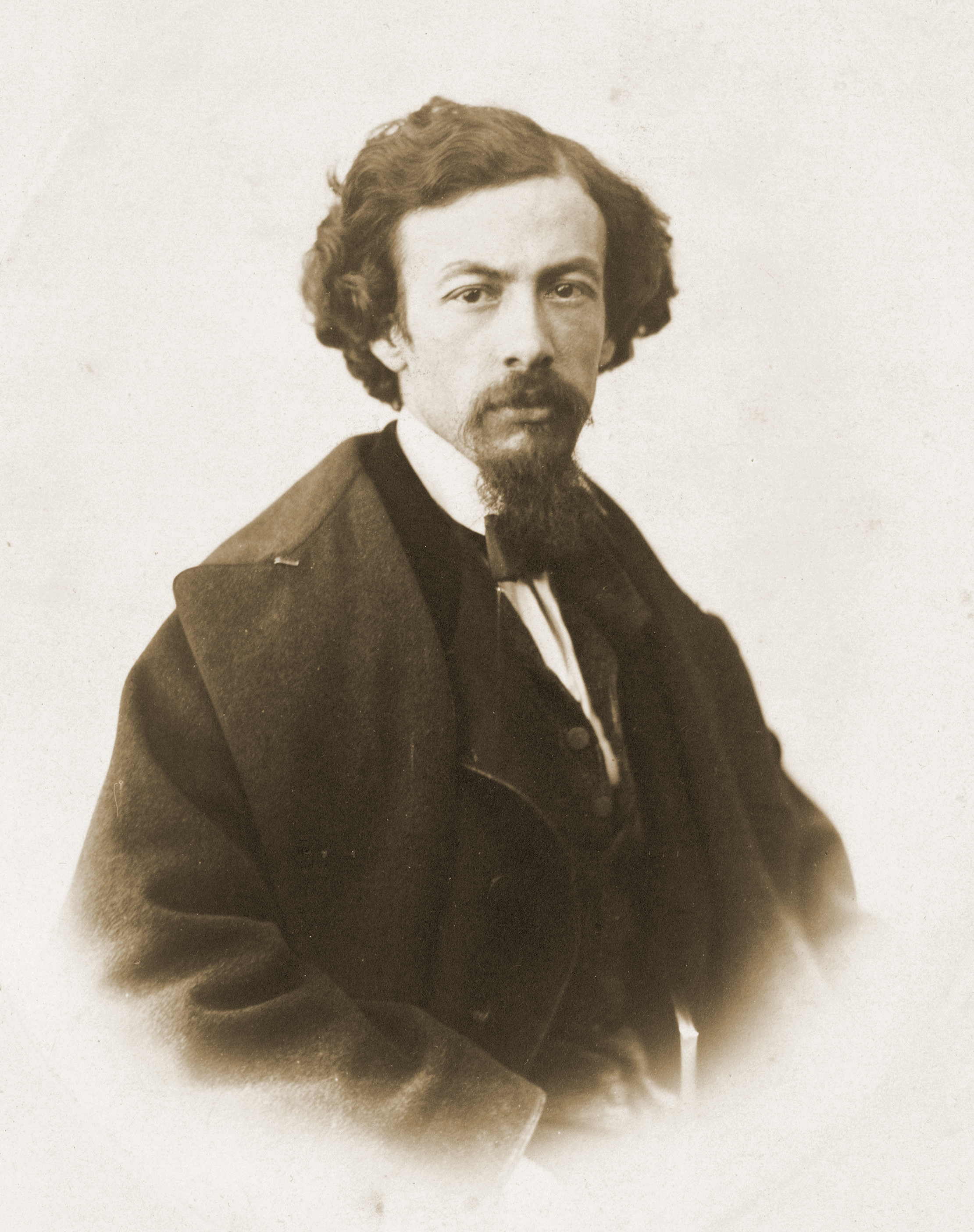
- Gustave Le Gray, Self-portrait, late 1850s
- Born: 30 August 1820; Villiers-le-Bel, Val-d'Oise, France
- Died: 30 July 1884 (aged 63); Cairo, Khedivate of Egypt
- Known for: Painter, draughtsman, sculptor, print-maker, photographer
- Notable work: Developed a number of photographic techniques
- Spouse: Palmira Maddalena Gertrude Leonardi (m. 1844)
- Children: 7

Jean-Baptiste Gustave Le Gray (French: [ʒɑ̃ batist ɡystav lə gʁɛ]; August 30, 1820 – July 30, 1884) was a French painter, draughtsman, sculptor, print-maker, and photographer. He has been called "the most important French photographer of the nineteenth century" because of his technical innovations, his instruction of other noted photographers, and "the extraordinary imagination he brought to picture making." He was an important contributor to the development of the wax paper negative.

== Biography ==
Gustave Le Gray was born on August 30, 1820 in Villiers-le-Bel, Val-d'Oise. He was an only child of a haberdasher. His parents encouraged him to become a solicitor's clerk, but from a young age, he aspired to be an artist. He was originally trained as a painter, studying under François-Édouard Picot and Paul Delaroche. His parents financed a trip to Switzerland and Italy so that he could study art abroad, and he lived in Italy between 1843 and 1846 and painted portraits and scenes of the countryside. In 1844, he met and married Palmira Maddalena Gertrude Leonardi (born March 23, 1823), a laundress who he had six children with, although only two survived into adulthood.

Le Gray exhibited his paintings at the Salon of 1848 and Salon of 1853. He then crossed over to photography in the early years of its development.

He made his first daguerreotypes by 1847. His real contributions – artistically and technically – were in the area of paper photography. His early photographs included portraits, scenes of nature such as Fontainebleau Forest, and buildings such as châteaux of the Loire Valley.

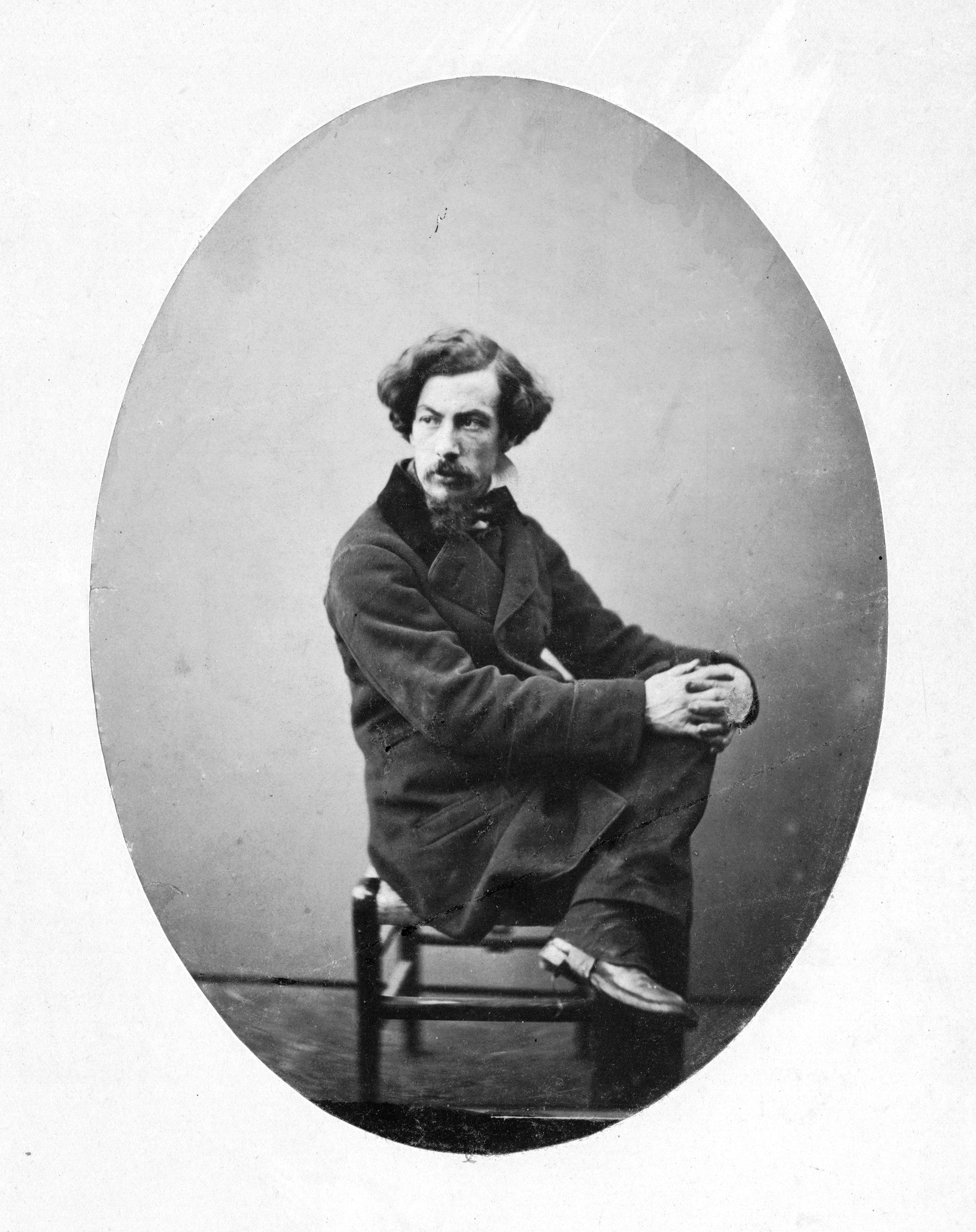
Self Portrait (c. 1851)

He taught photography to students such as Charles Nègre, Henri Le Secq, Nadar, Olympe Aguado, and Maxime Du Camp. In 1851, he became one of the first five photographers hired for the Missions Héliographiques to document French monuments and buildings. In that same year, he helped found the Société Héliographique, the "first photographic organization in the world." Le Gray published a treatise on photography, which went through four editions, in 1850, 1851, 1852, and 1854.

In 1855, Le Gray opened a "lavishly furnished" studio. At that time, becoming progressively the official photographer of Napoleon III, he became a successful portraitist. His most famous work dates from this period, 1856 to 1858, especially his seascapes. The studio was a fancy place, but in spite of his artistic success, his business was a financial failure: the business was poorly managed and ran into debts. He therefore "closed his studio, abandoned his wife and children, and fled the country to escape his creditors."

He began to tour the Mediterranean in 1860 with the writer Alexandre Dumas, père. They encountered Giuseppe Garibaldi during the trip and Le Gray photographed Garibaldi and Palermo. His striking pictures of Giuseppe Garibaldi and Palermo under Sicilian bombardment became as instantly famous throughout Europe. Dumas abandoned Le Gray and the other travelers in Malta and joined the revolutionary forces as a result of a personal conflict. Le Gray went to Lebanon, then Syria where he covered the movements of the French army for a magazine in 1861. Injured, he remained there before heading to Egypt. In Alexandria he photographed Henri d'Artois and the future Edward VII of the United Kingdom, and wrote to Nadar while sending him pictures. In 1862, his wife Leonardi returned to Rome, requesting and receiving 150 francs for financial assistance. In 1863, Leonardi asked Le Gray to provide her with a monthly pension of 50 or 60 francs.

He established himself in Cairo in 1864 earning a modest living as a professor of drawing, while retaining a small photography shop. He sent pictures to the universal exhibition in 1867 but they did not really catch anyone's attention. He received commissions from the vice-king Ismail Pasha. From this late period there remain 50 pictures.

In 1868, a collection of photographic seascapes by Gustave Le Gray was donated by millionaire art collector Chauncy Hare Townshend to the Victoria and Albert Museum. (He had kept them in portfolios along with his watercolors, etchings and engravings; they therefore remained in excellent condition, preserved to museum standards almost since they were made.)

On 16 January 1883, he had a son with the nineteen-year-old Anaïs Candounia. Registration of their sons birth was voided due to lack of proof of Leonardi's death. Le Gray died on 30 July 1884, in Cairo. His only surviving child from his marriage to Leonardi, Alfred, was designated as his heir.

== Technical innovations ==
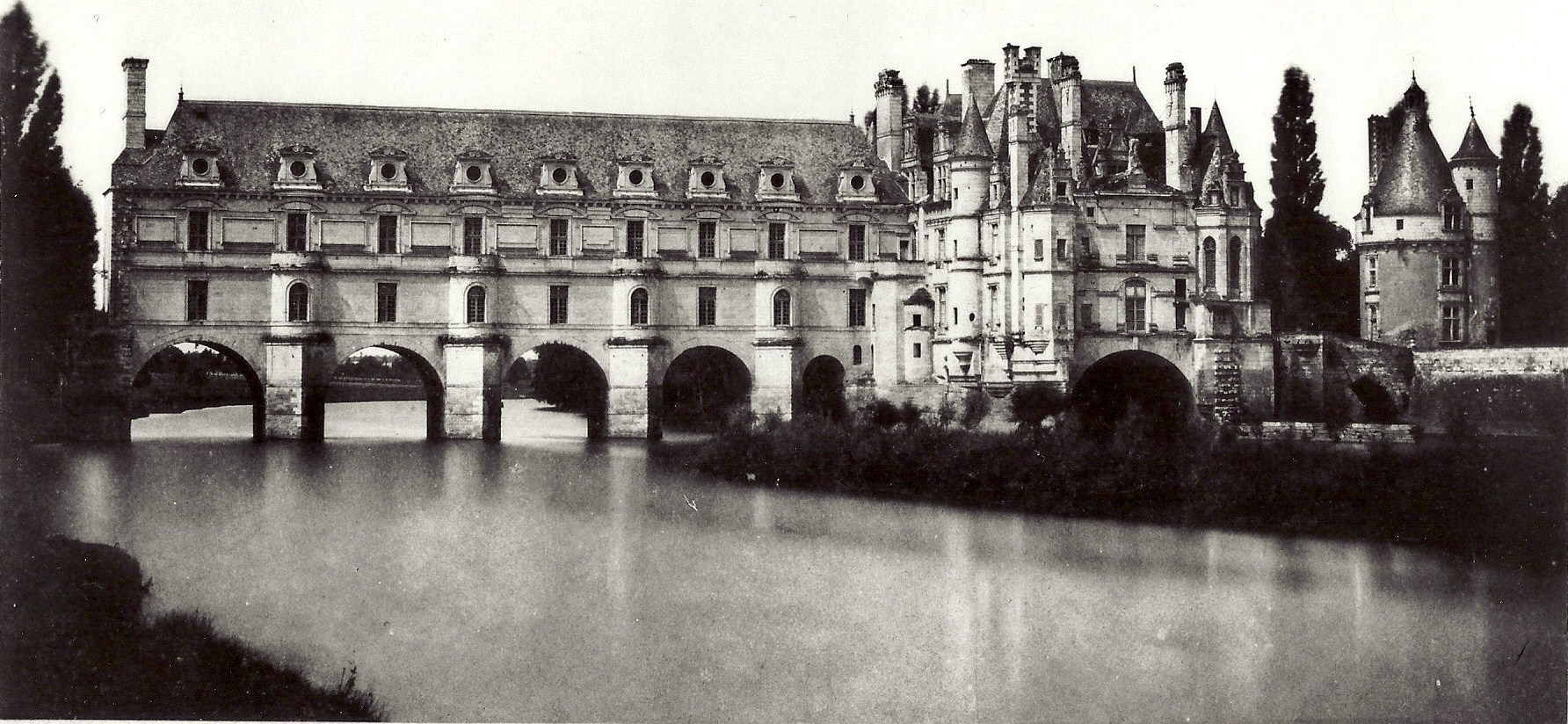
Château de Chenonceau (1851)

His technical innovations included:

- Improvements on paper negatives, specifically waxing them before exposure "making the paper more receptive to fine detail".
- A collodion process published in 1850 but which was "theoretical at best". The invention of the wet collodion method to produce a negative on a glass plate is now credited to Frederick Scott Archer who published his process in 1851.
- Combination printing, creating seascapes by using one negative for the water and one negative for the sky.

== Works ==
Le Gray documented French monuments on a mission for the French government with other French photographers.

He was a successful portrait photographer, capturing figures such as Napoleon III and Edward VII. He also became famous for his seascapes, or marine. He spent 20 years in Cairo, Egypt, but there are few works from this period.

=== World records for most expensive photograph sold at auction, 1999–2003 ===
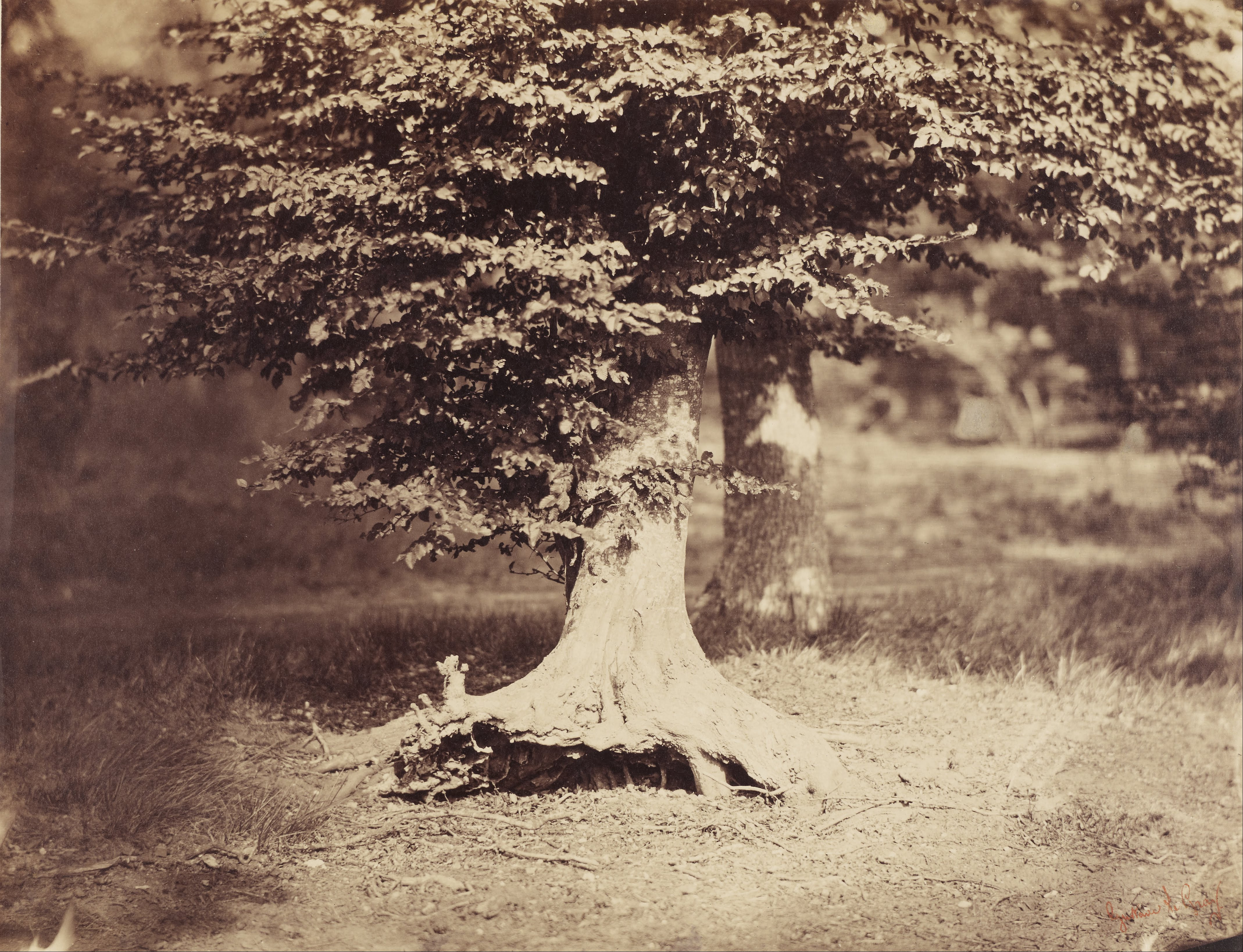
The Beech Tree (c. 1856)

In October 1999, Sotheby's sold a Le Gray albumen print "Beech Tree, Fontainebleau" for £419,500, which was a world record for the most expensive single photograph ever sold at auction, to an anonymous buyer. At the same auction, an albumen print of "The Great Wave, Sète" by Le Gray was sold for a new world record price of £507,500 or $840,370 to "the same anonymous buyer" who was later revealed to be Sheik Saud Al-Thani of Qatar. The record stood until May 2003 when Al-Thani purchased a daguerreotype by Joseph-Philibert Girault de Prangey for £565,250 or $922,488.

=== Books ===
- A practical treatise on photography, upon paper and glass by Gustave Le Gray, (translated by Thomas Cousins) London : T. & R. Willats, 1850.
- Photographic manipulation: the waxed paper process of Gustave Le Gray by Gustave Le Gray. Translated from the French. London: George Knight and Sons, 1853.

== Gallery ==
Architecture and landscapes

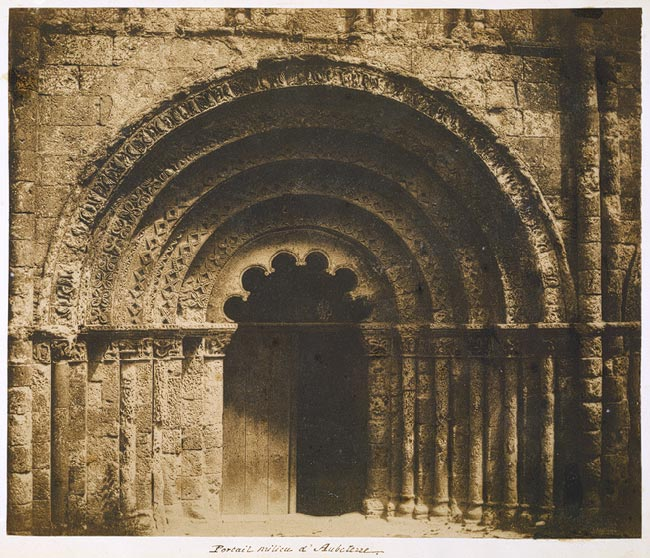
Central portal of the Church of Saint-Jacques, Aubeterre, France (1851)

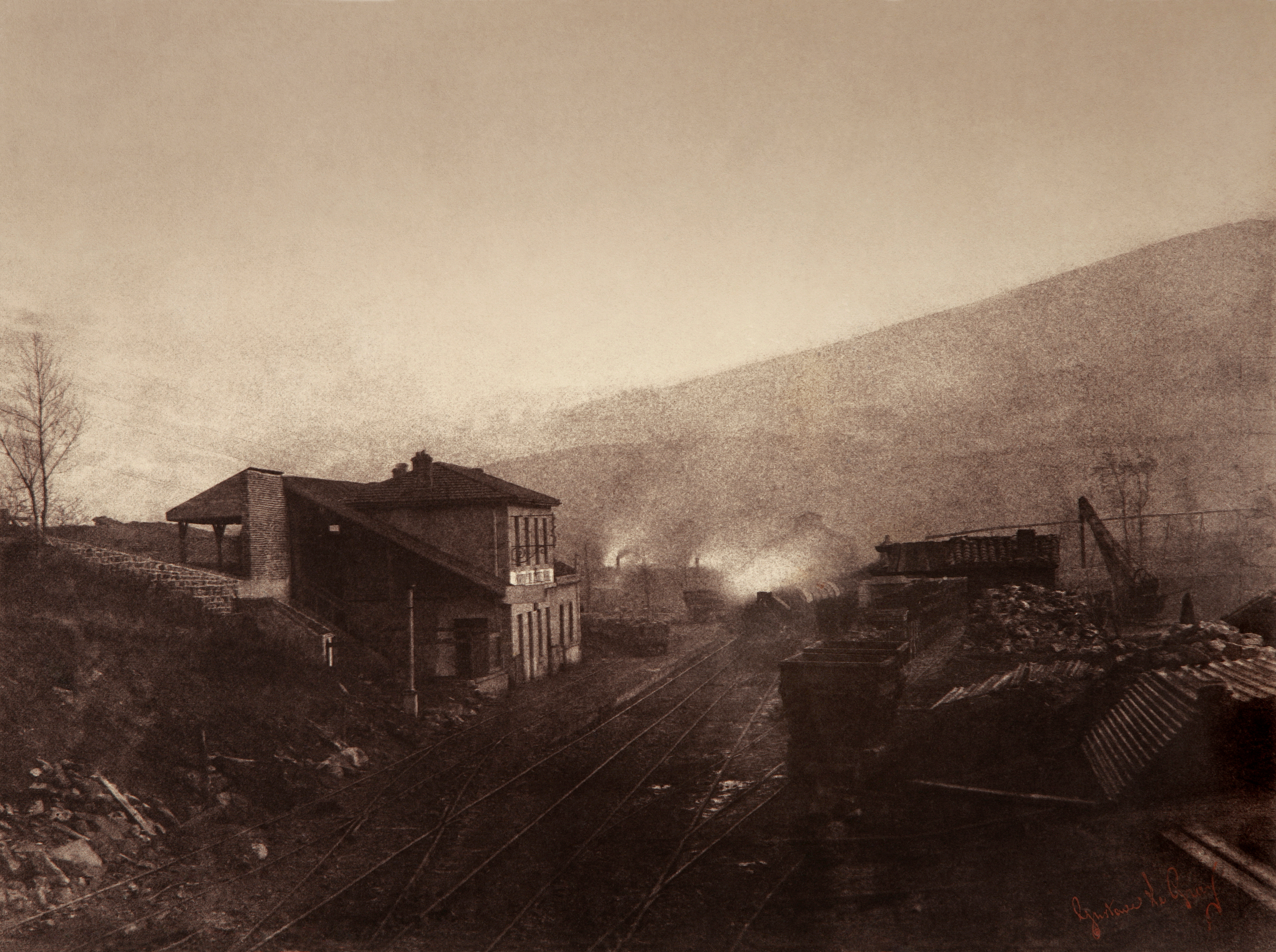
Train station with train and coal depot, digitally restored

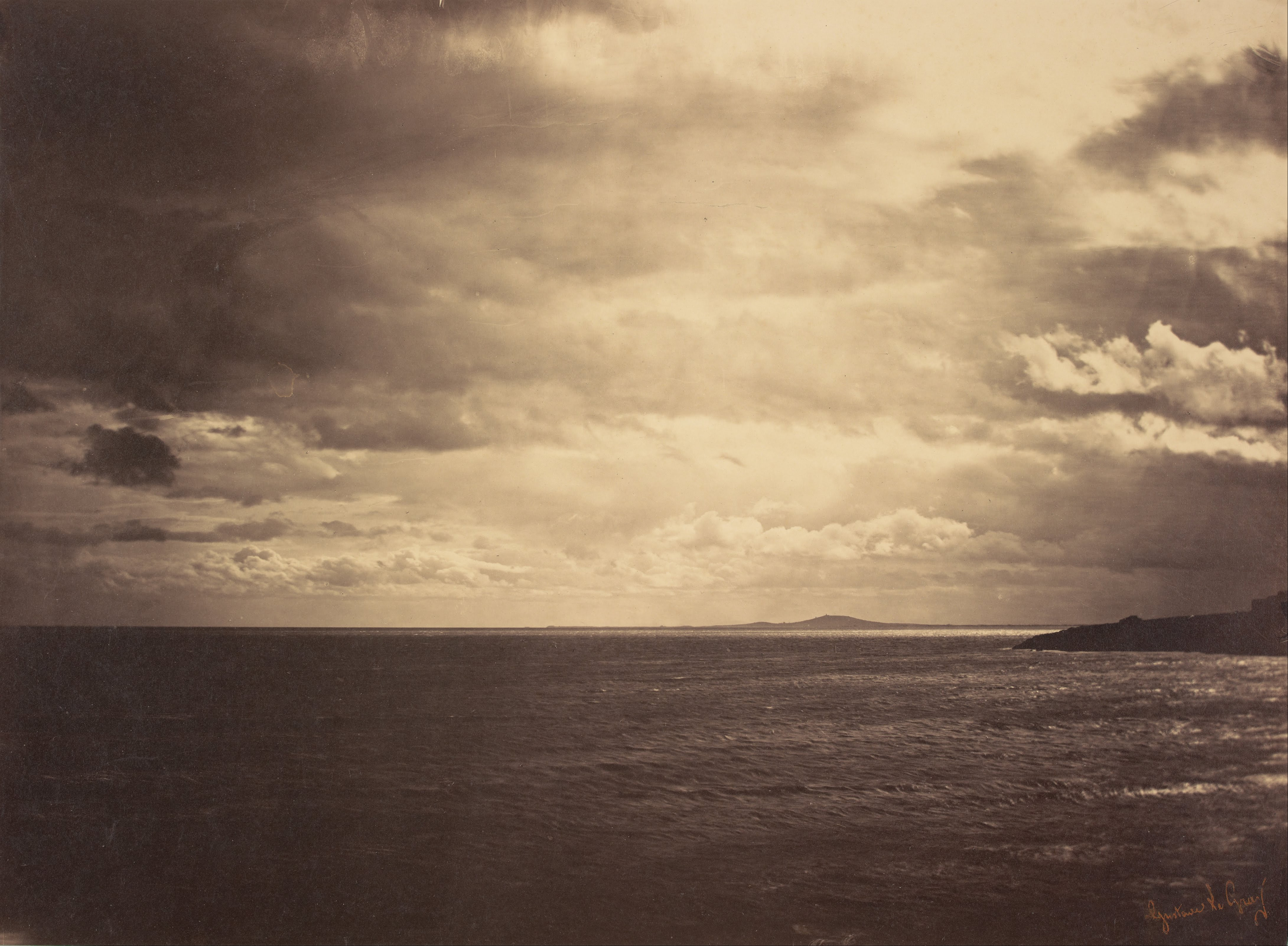
Cloudy Sky - Mediterranean Sea

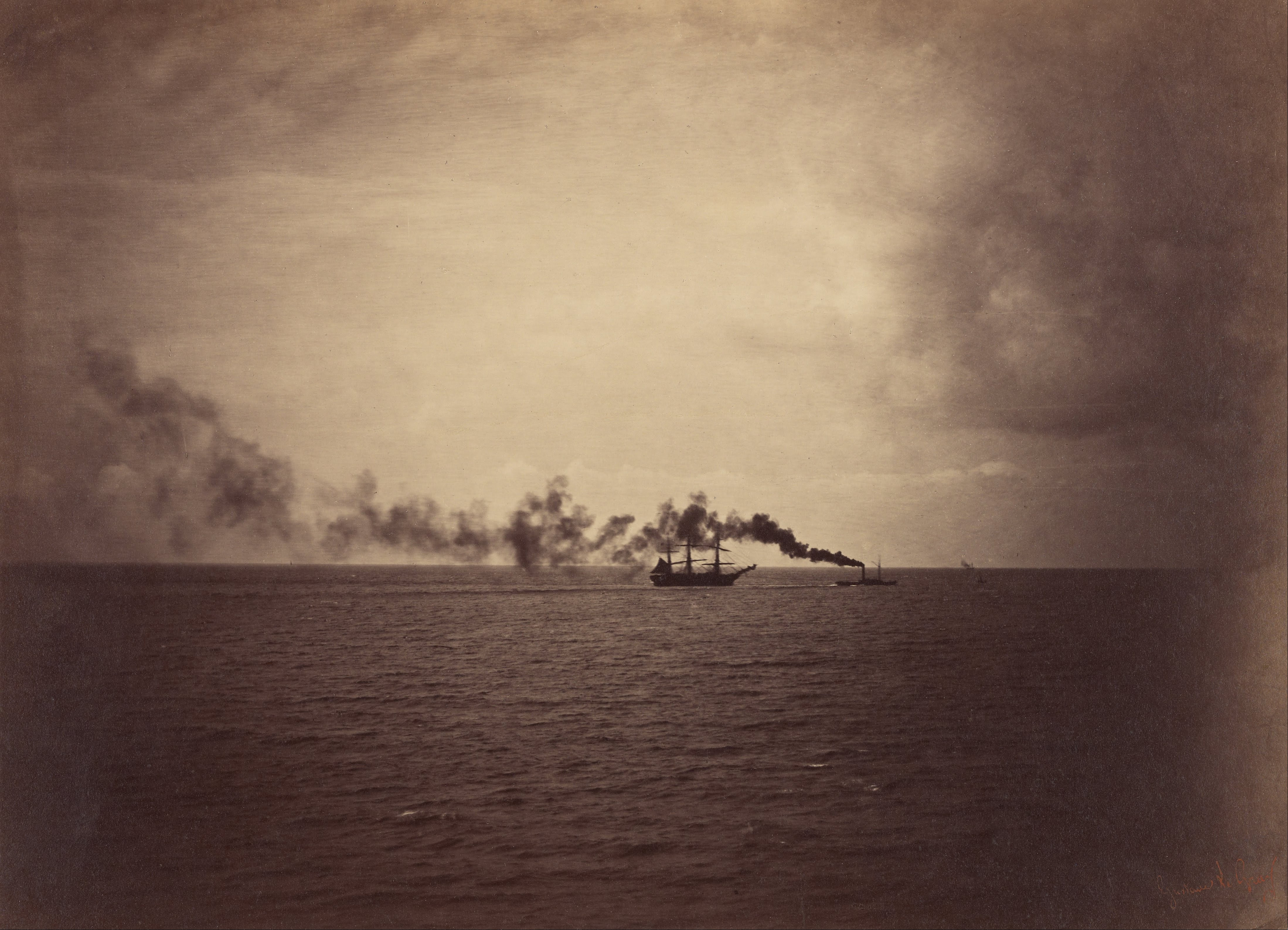
Seascape with Sailing Ship and Tugboat

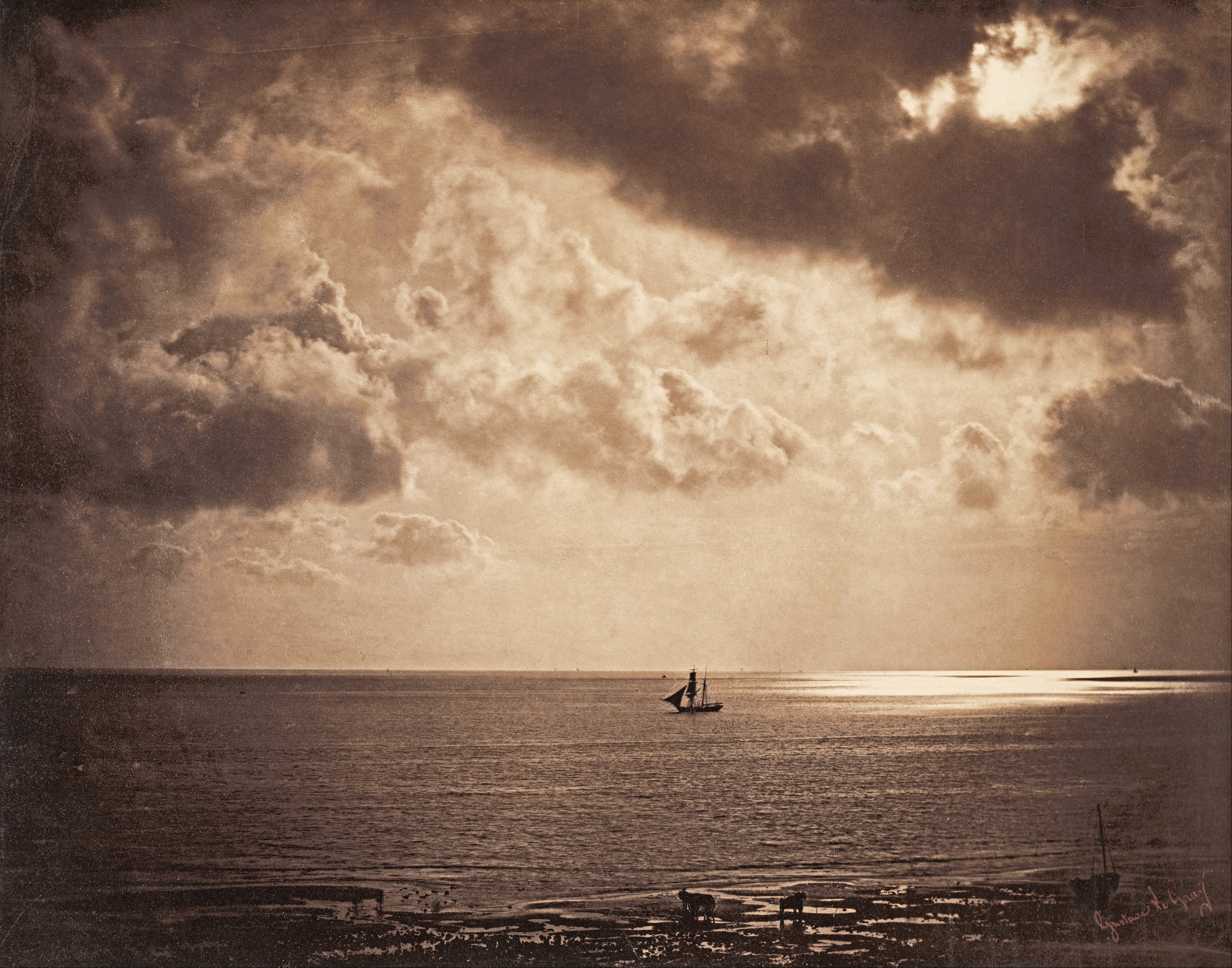
Brig upon the Water

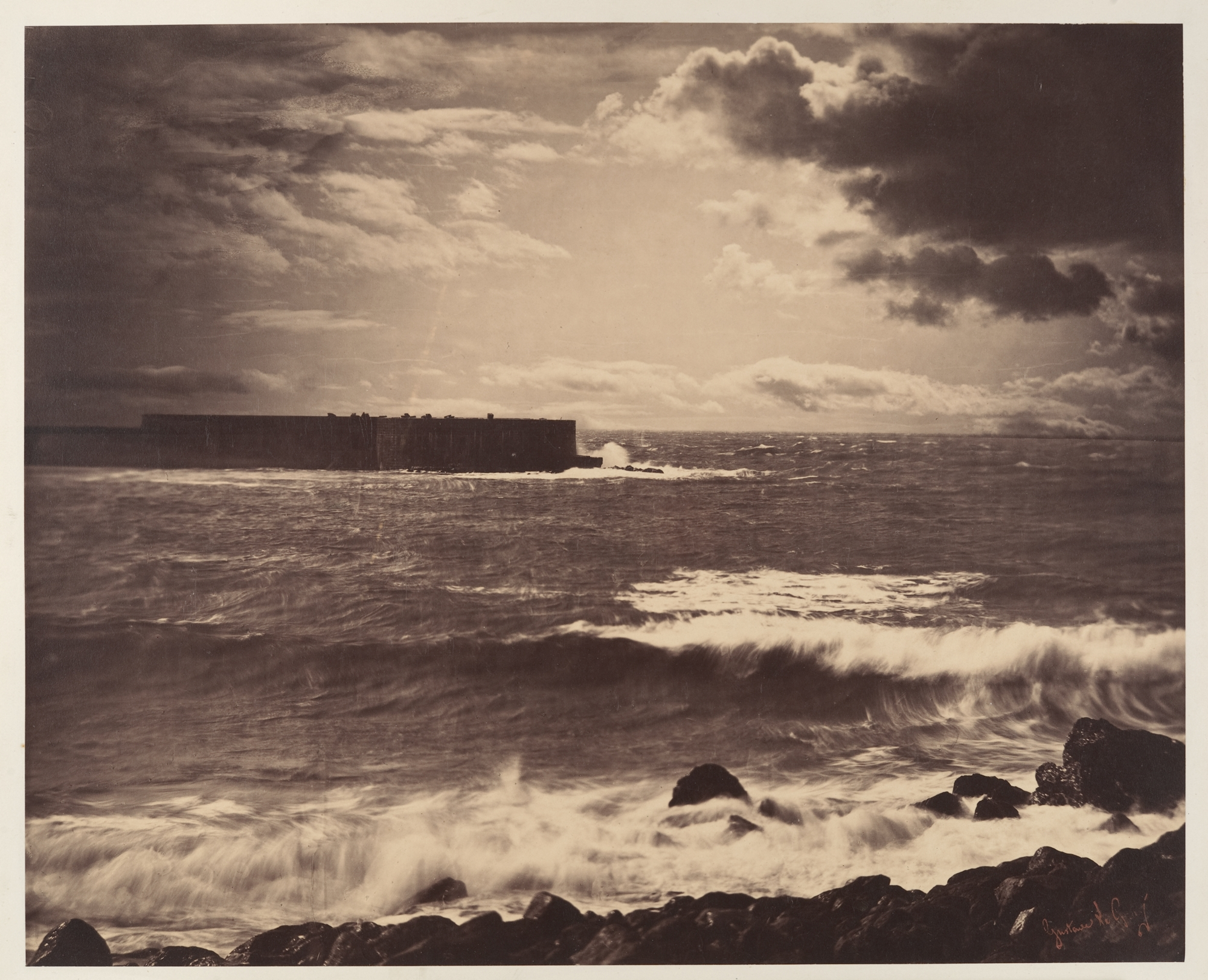
The Great Wave, Sète

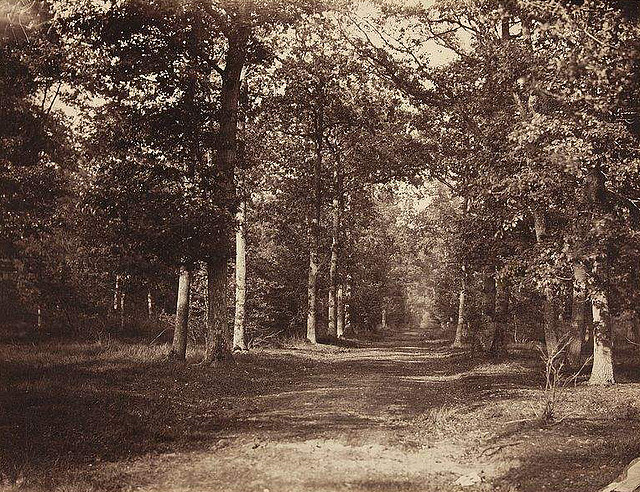
Forest of Fontainebleau (1855)

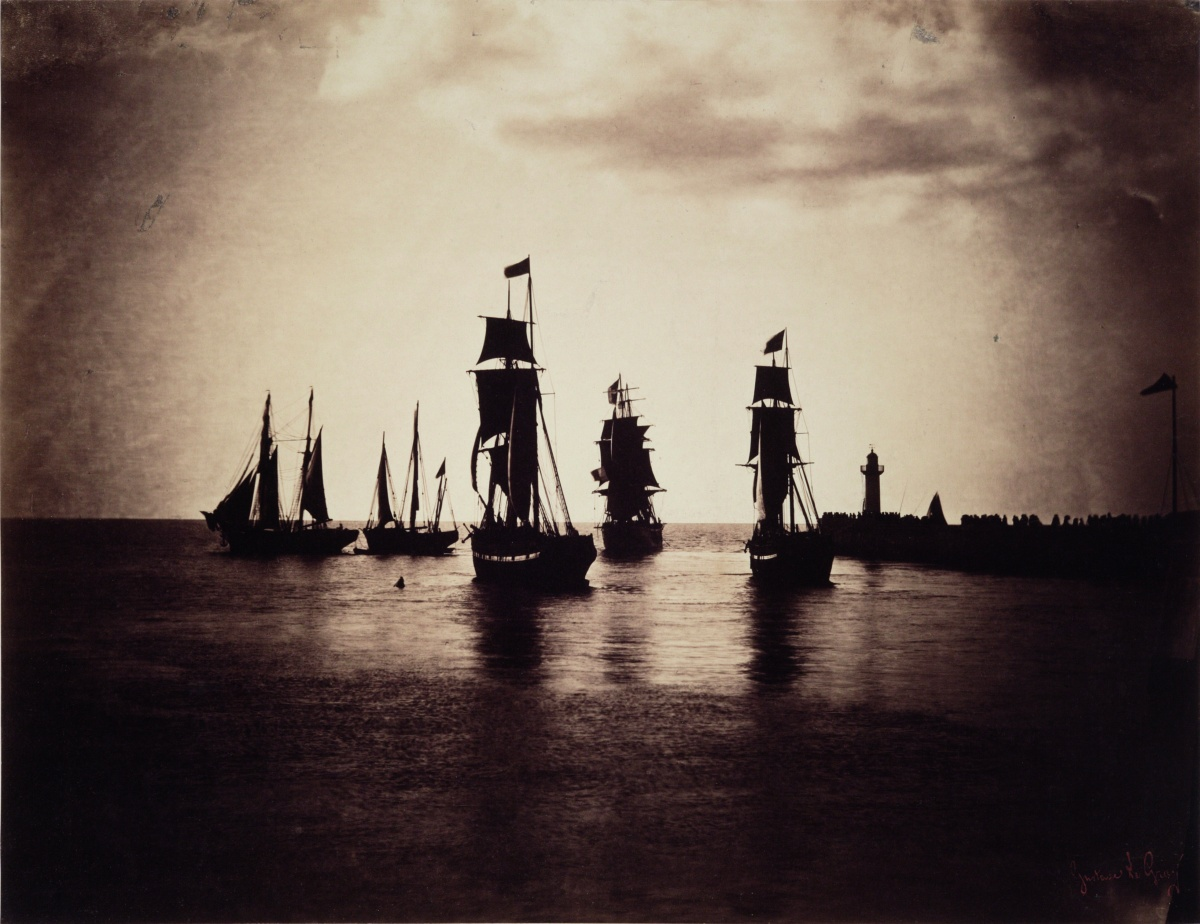
Bateaux quittant le port du Havre (1855/1856)

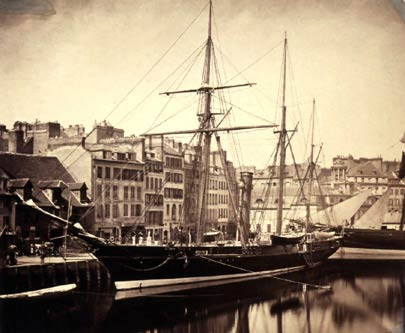
Imperial yacht Reine Hortense (1856)

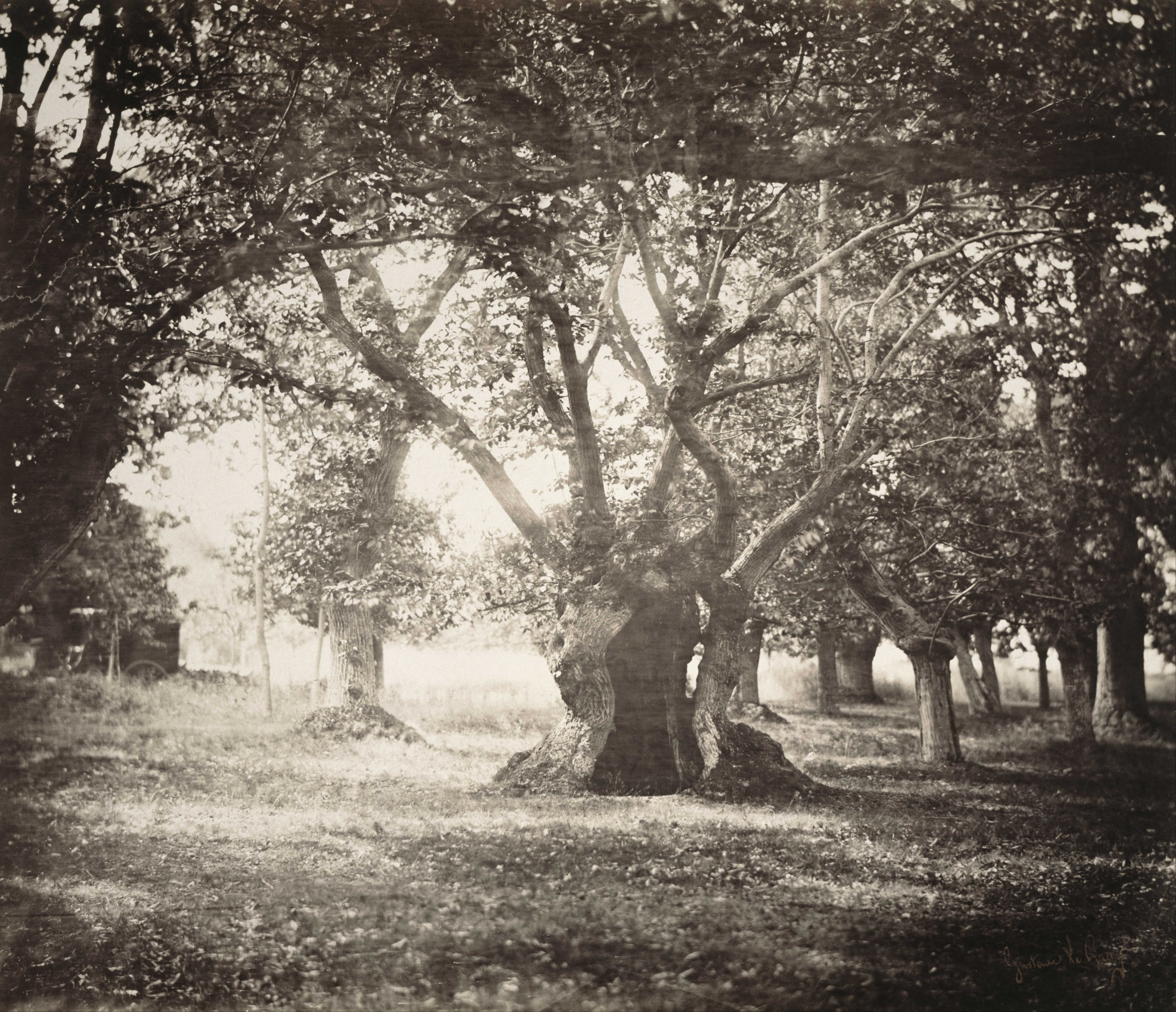
Forest of Fontainbleau (c. 1856)

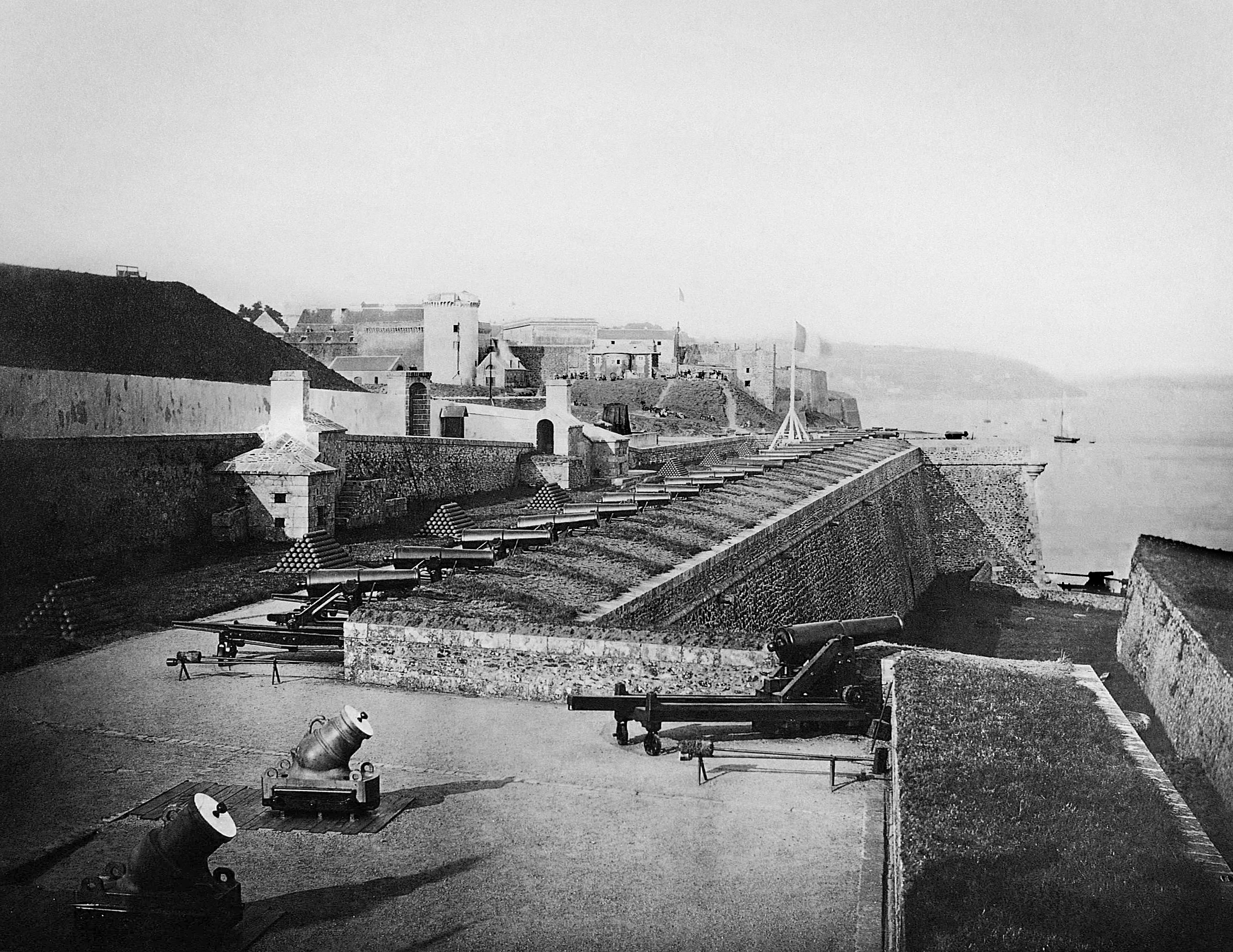
Batterie Royale à Brest (1858)

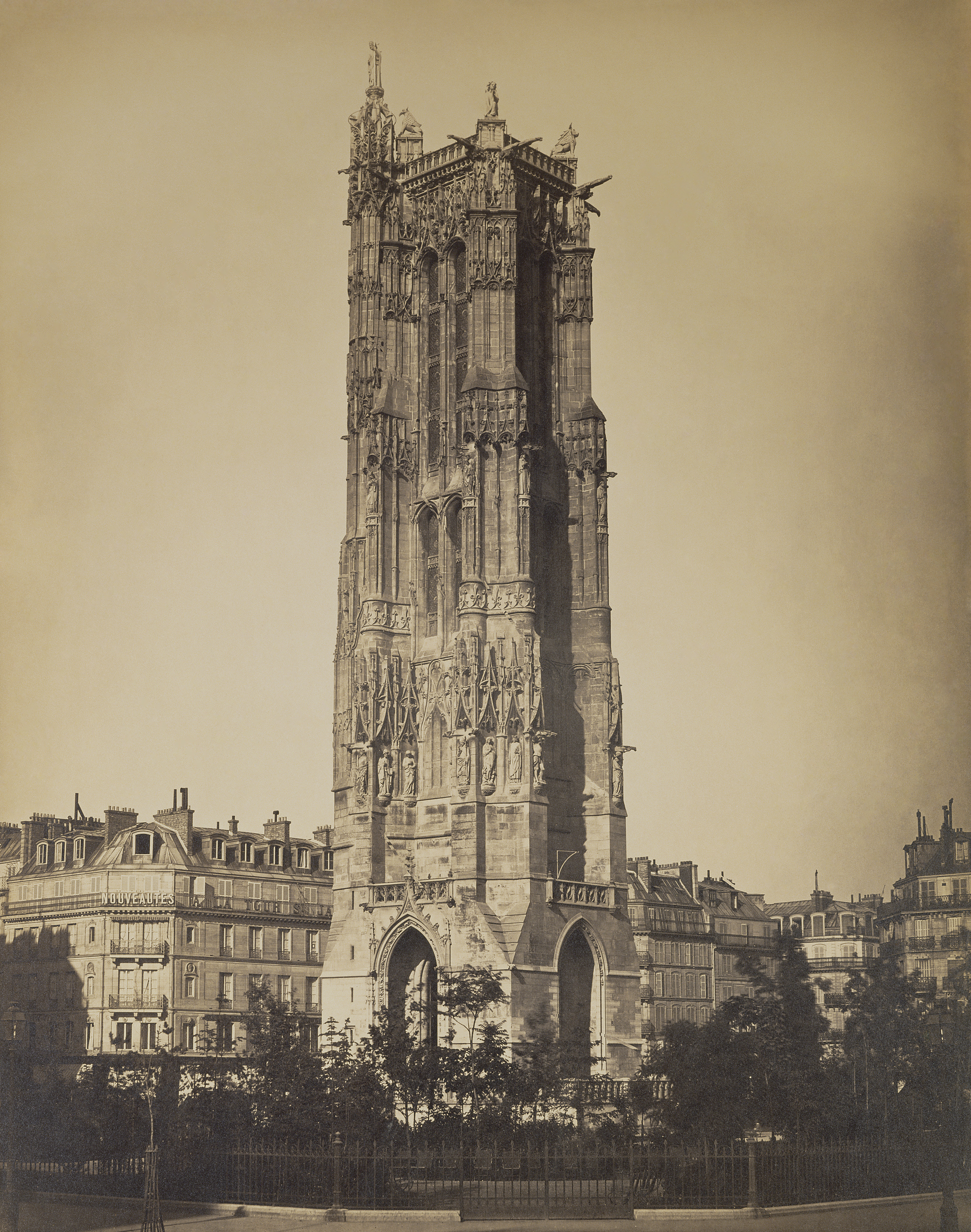
Tour Saint-Jacques (1859)

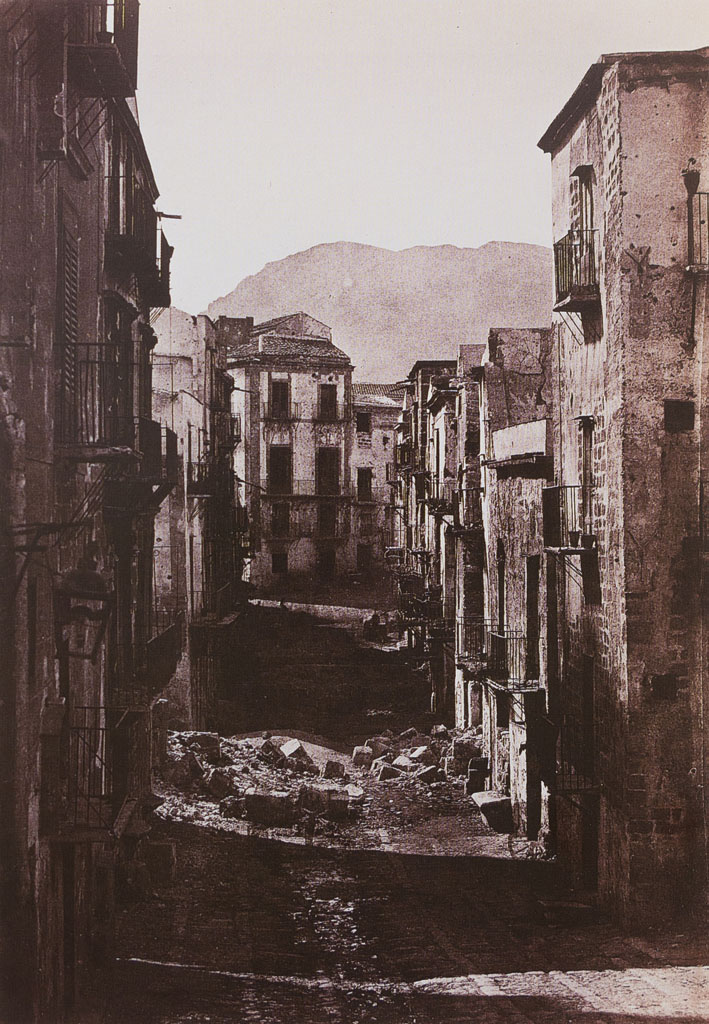
Palermo (1860)

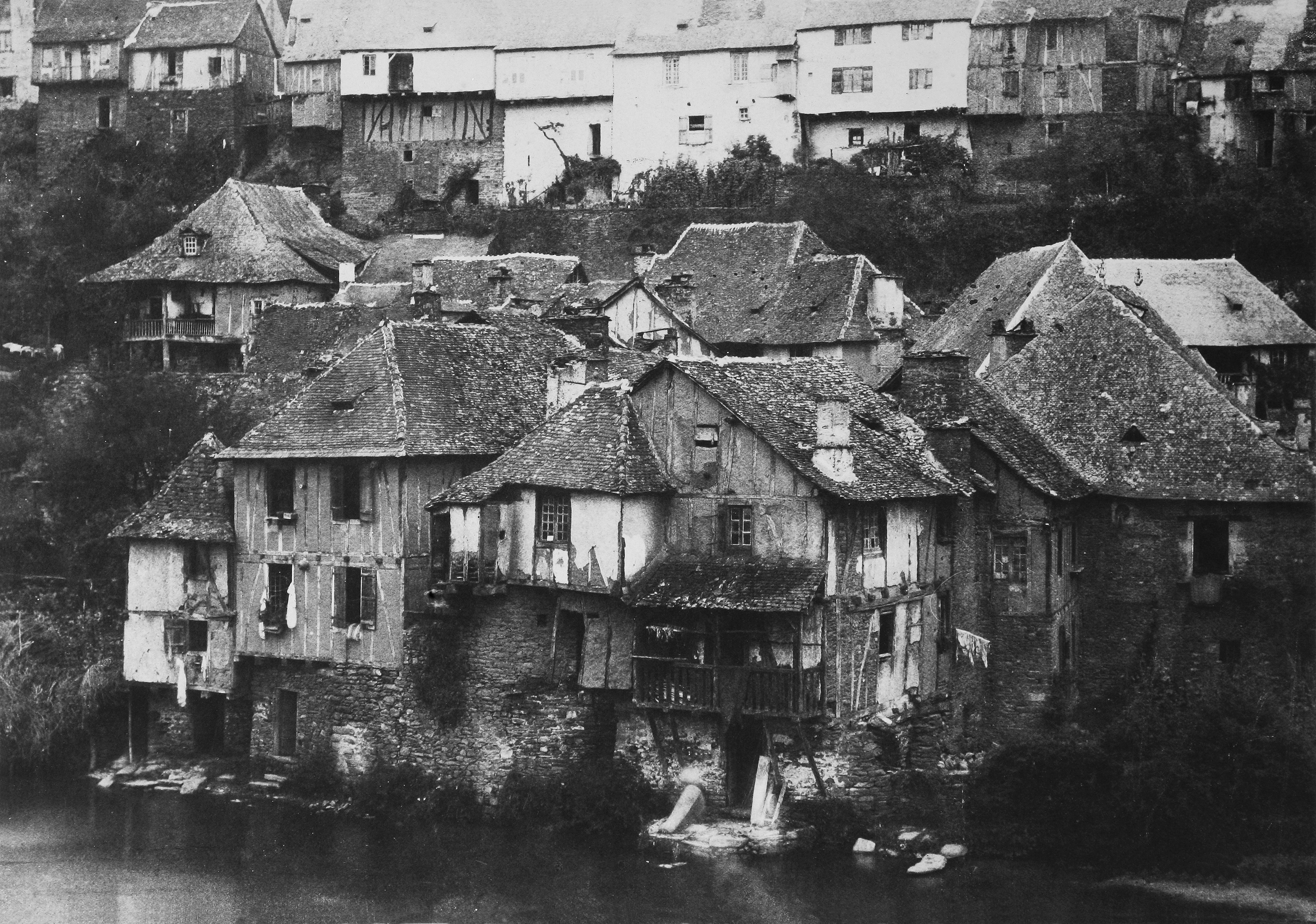
Waterfront village (Uzerche)
Portraits

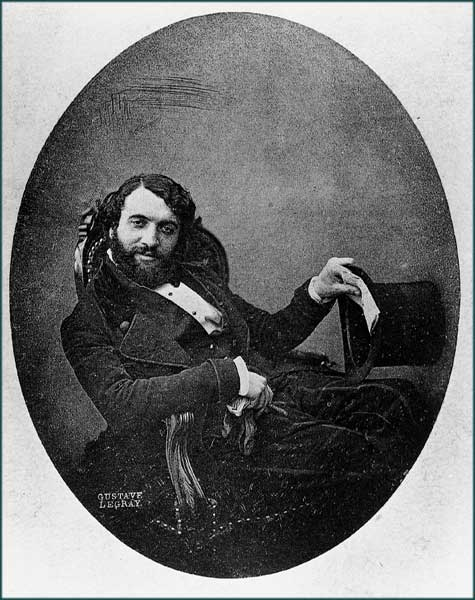
Henri Le Secq (1848)

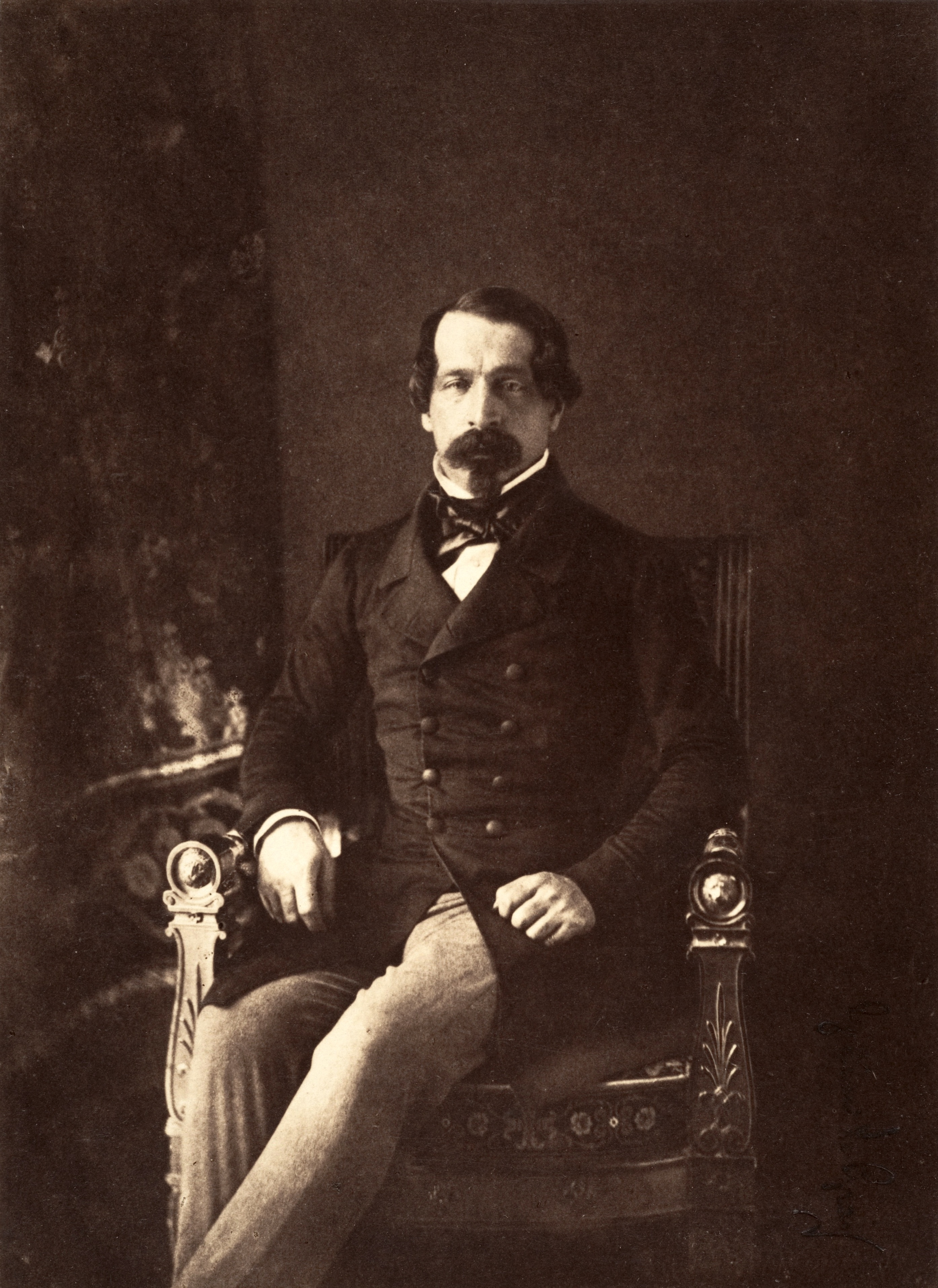
Louis-Napoléon (1852)

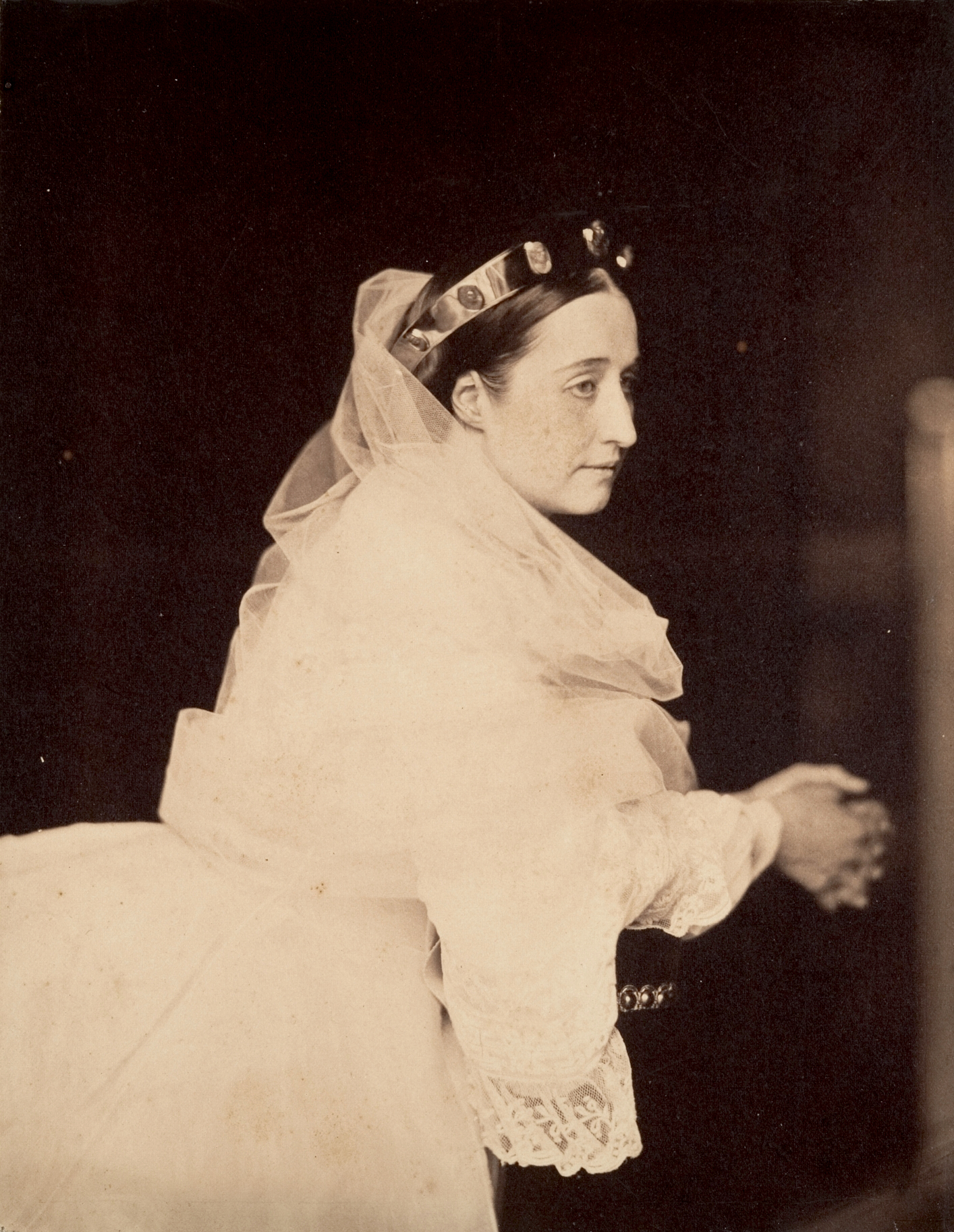
Empress Eugenie (1856)

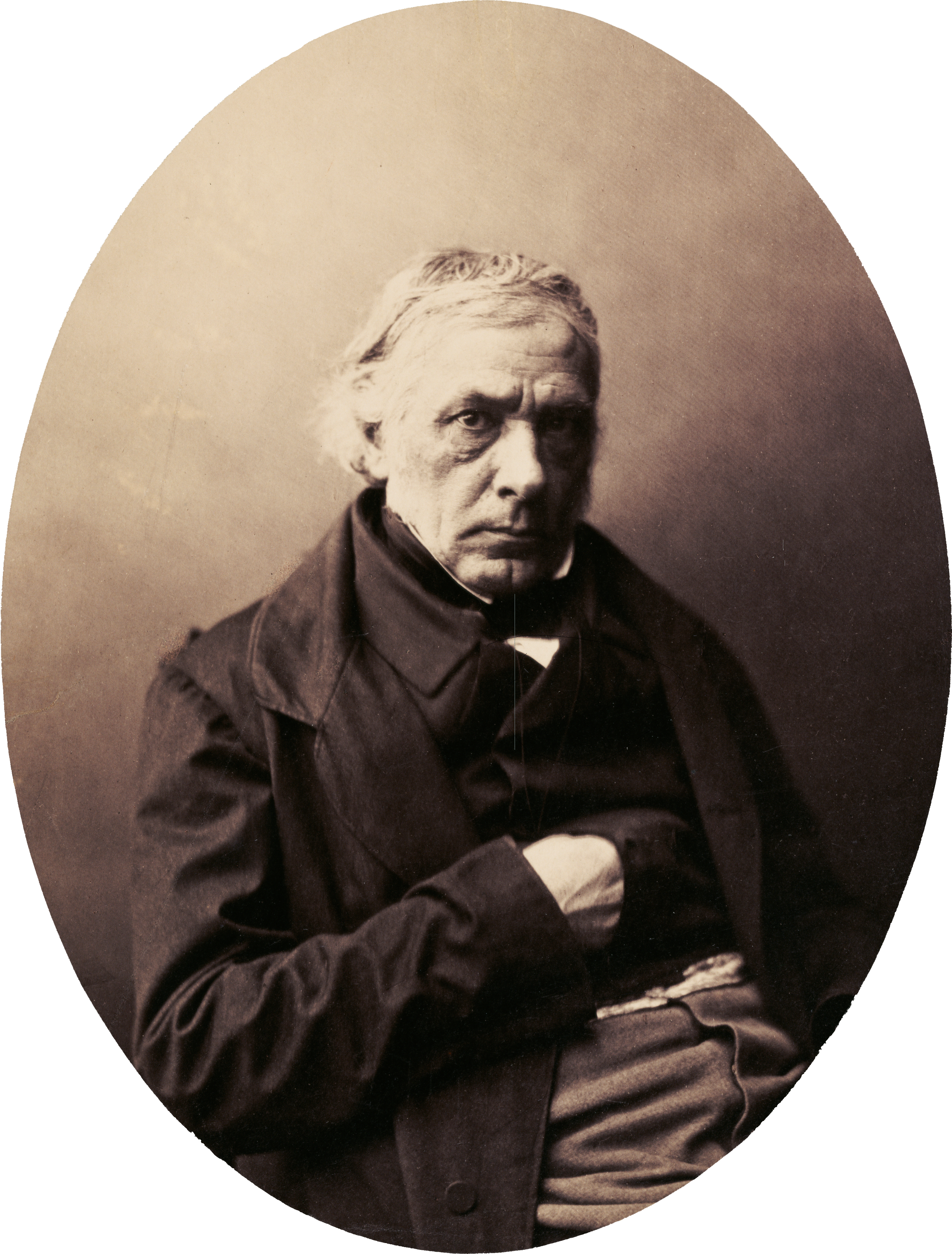
Victor Cousin

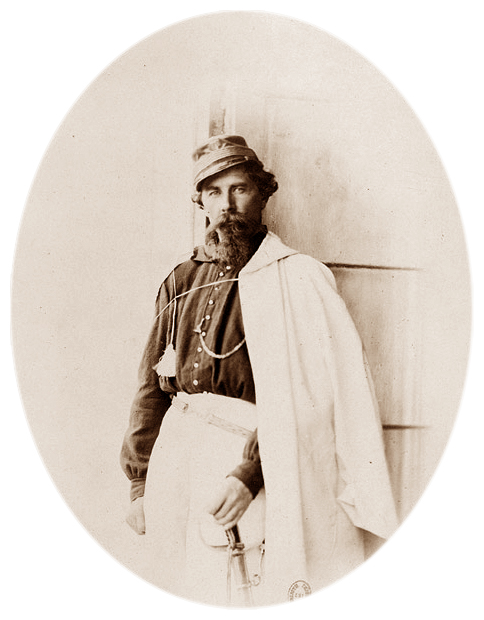
General István Türr (1860)

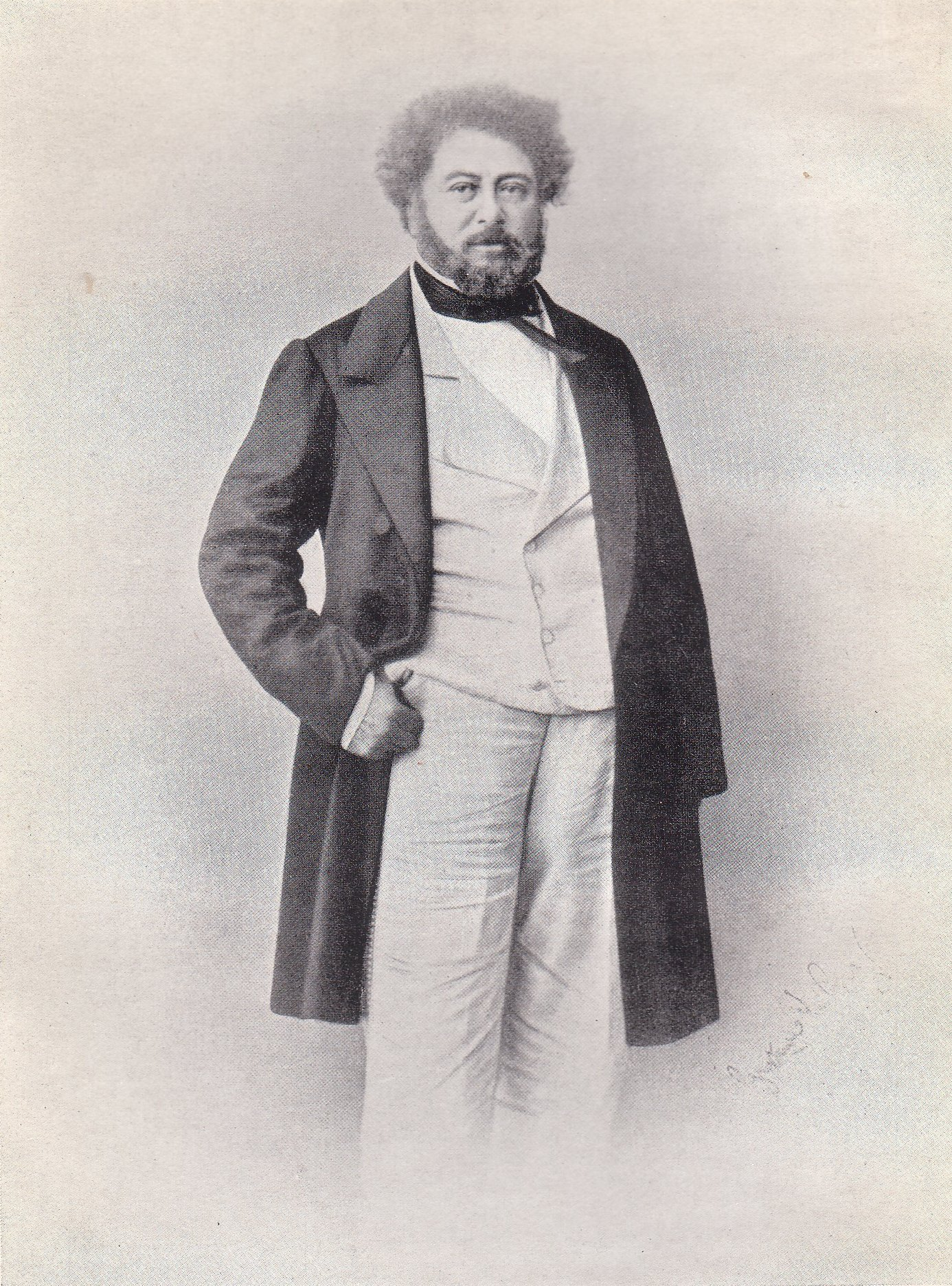
Alexandre Dumas (1860)

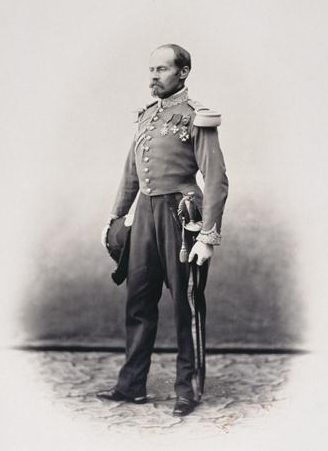
Napoléon Louis de Méneval

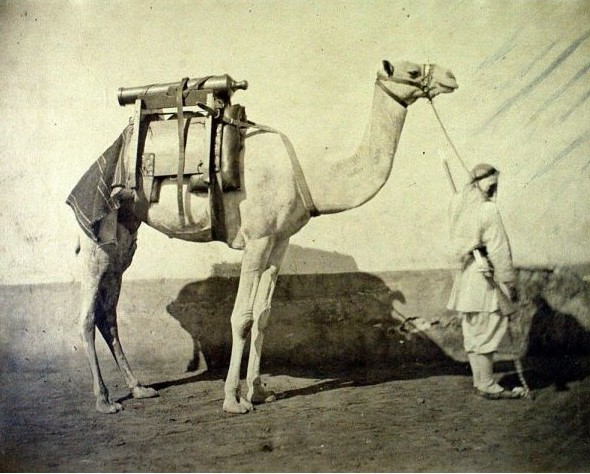
Camel transporting artillery, Egypt (1866)

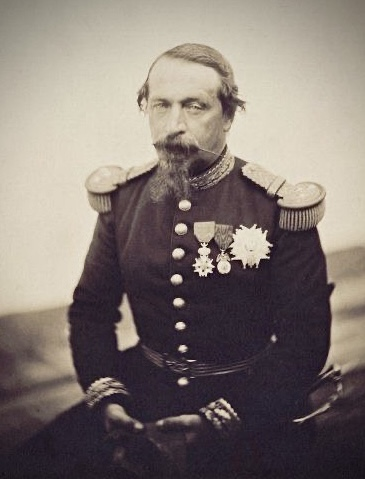
Napoleon III, (1857)
Paintings

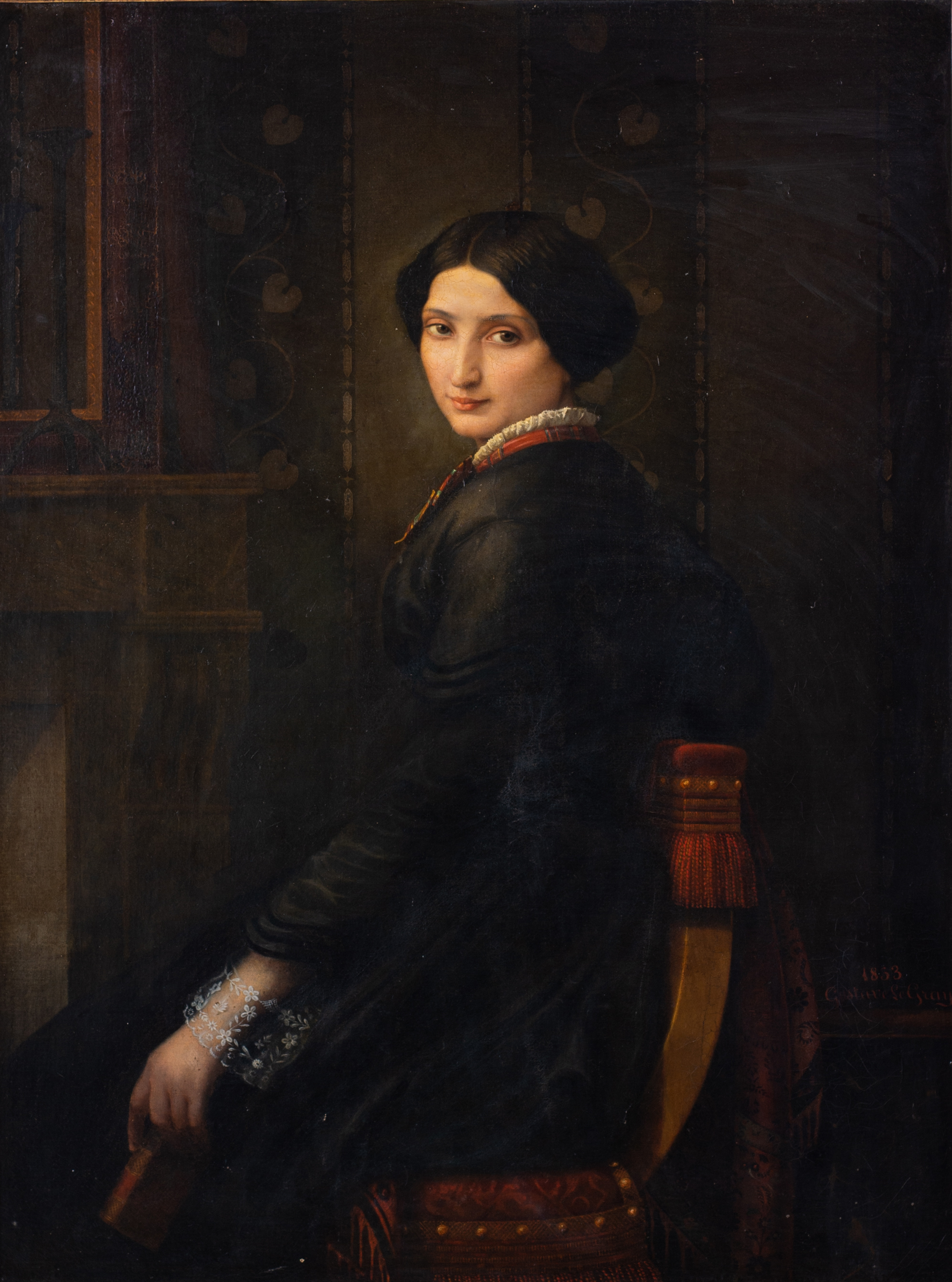
Portrait of Mme G. L. (Palmira Leonardi, wife of the artist), 1853

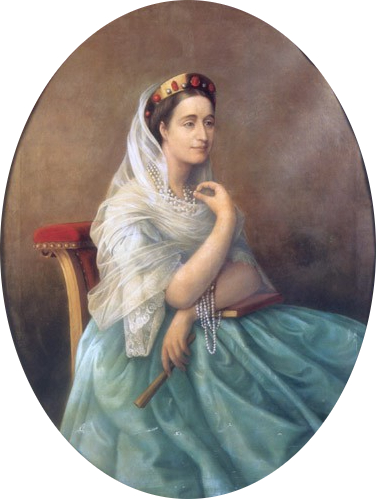
Empress Eugénie, 1869, commissioned by Isma'il Pasha, given to the Empress on the occasion of the inauguration of the Suez Canal

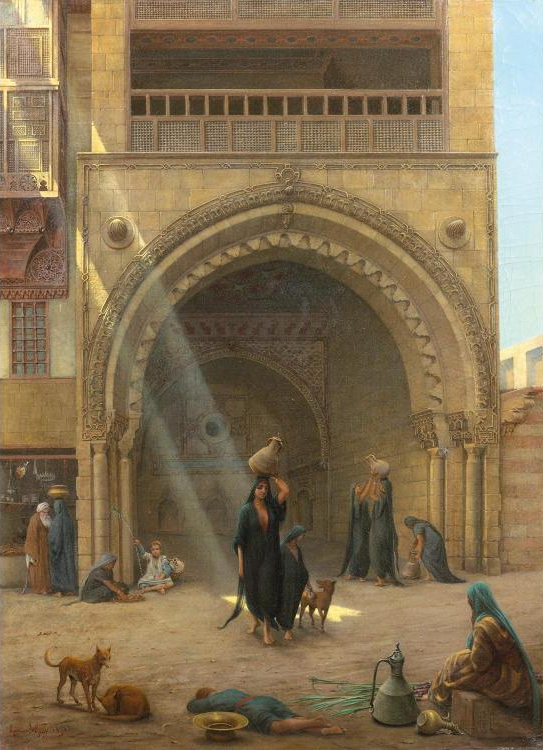
Back from the Fountain, Cairo, 1873

== Legacy ==
Caroline Shaw has a piano piece inspired by Le Gray (because of the "blurring of the edges" and "slowly coming into focus", according to Shaw) and Chopin's Mazurka in A minor, Op. 17, No. 4.

== See also ==
- Charles Nègre
- History of photography
- List of most expensive photographs
- Société française de photographie
