= Alejandro María Aguado, 1st Marquess of Marismas del Guadalquivir =

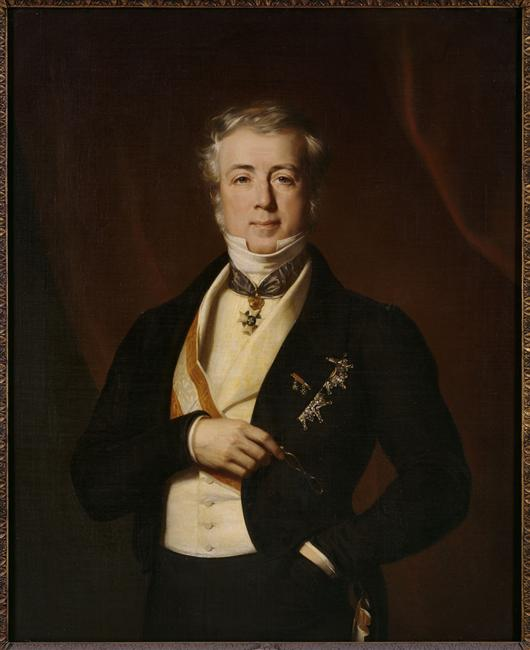
Portrait of Aguado by an unknown artist, Palace of Versailles

Alejandro María Aguado y Remírez de Estenoz, 1st Marquess of Marismas del Guadalquivir (29 June 1784, in Sevilla – 14 April 1842, in Gijón), was an influential Spanish banker in the nineteenth century.

He began life as a soldier, fighting with distinction in the Spanish War of Independence first against the French, then on the side of Joseph Bonaparte. After the Battle of Bailén (1808) he entered the French army, in which he rose to be colonel and aide-de-camp to Marshal Soult.

He was exiled in 1815, and immediately started business as a commission-agent in Paris, where, chiefly through his family connexions in Havana and Mexico, he acquired in a few years enough wealth to enable him to undertake banking. The Spanish government gave him full powers to negotiate the loans of 1823, 1828, 1830 and 1831; and Ferdinand VII rewarded him with the title of Marquess of Marismas del Guadalquivir, the decorations of several orders and valuable mining concessions in Spain. Aguado also negotiated the Greek loan of 1834. In 1828, having become possessed of large estates in France, including the Château Margaux, famous for its wine, he was naturalized as a French citizen. He died in Spain on 14 April 1842, leaving a fortune computed at 60,000,000 francs, and a splendid collection of pictures which at his death was sold by auction.

== Honors and Awards ==
- Grand Cross of the Order of Legion of Honour
- Commander of the Order of Charles III
- Commander of the Order of Isabella the Catholic
- Commander of the Order of the Redeemer
