= Marquess of Marismas del Guadalquivir =

Hereditary title in the Peerage of Spain

- Creation date: 20 May 1829
- Created by: Ferdinand VII
- Peerage: Peerage of Spain
- First holder: Alejandro María Aguado y Ramírez de Estenoz, 1st Marquess of Marismas del Guadalquivir
- Present holder: María Victoria Escobar y Cancho, 8th Marchioness of Marismas del Guadalquivir

Marquess of Marismas del Guadalquivir (Spanish: Marqués de las Marismas del Guadalquivir) is a hereditary title in the Peerage of Spain, granted in 1829 by Ferdinand VII to Alejandro María Aguado, an important merchant banker.

At the death with not descendants of the 4th Marquess in 1894, the title became extinct until it was rehabilitated by Alfonso XIII in 1919 on behalf of María de la Concepción Kirkpatrick, a direct descendant of the 1st Marquess' grandmother.

The title derives its territorial designation from the Guadalquivir Marshes between the provinces of Huelva, Seville and Cádiz.

== Marquesses of las Marismas del Guadalquivir (1829) ==
- Alejandro Aguado y Ramírez de Estenoz, 1st Marquess of Marismas del Guadalquivir (1784-1842)
- Alejandro Aguado y Moreno, 2nd Marquess of Marismas del Guadalquivir (1813-1861), only son of the 1st Marquess
- Alejandro Aguado y MacDonell, 3rd Marquess of Marismas del Guadalquivir (1842-1880), eldest son of the 2nd Marquess
- Arturo Aguado y MacDonell, 4th Marquess of Marismas del Guadalquivir (1845-1894), second son of the 3rd Marquess

== Marquesses of Marismas del Guadalquivir (1919) ==
- María de la Concepción Kirkpatrick y O'Farrill, 5th Marchioness of Marismas del Guadalquivir (1875-1954), great-great-great-great granddaughter of Tomasa María de Herrera y Chacón, grandmother of the 1st Marquess
- José Ignacio Escobar y Kirkpatrick, 6th Marquess of Marismas del Guadalquivir (1898-1977), eldest son of the 5th Marchioness
- Luis Escobar y Kirkpatrick, 7th Marquess of Marismas del Guadalquivir (1908-1991), second son of the 5th Marchioness
- María Victoria Escobar y Cancho, 8th Marchioness of Marismas del Guadalquivir (b. 1955), eldest daughter of the 6th Marquess

== See also ==
- Spanish nobility
