= Freer Gallery of Art =

Art museum in Washington, D.C.

- Interactive fullscreen map
- Established: 1923
- Location: 1050 Independence Avenue; Washington, D.C.
- Coordinates: 38°53′18″N 77°01′39″W
- Director: Chase F. Robinson
- Public transit access: Smithsonian
- Website: www.asia.si.edu
- Freer Gallery Of Art
- U.S. National Register of Historic Places
- U.S. National Historic Landmark
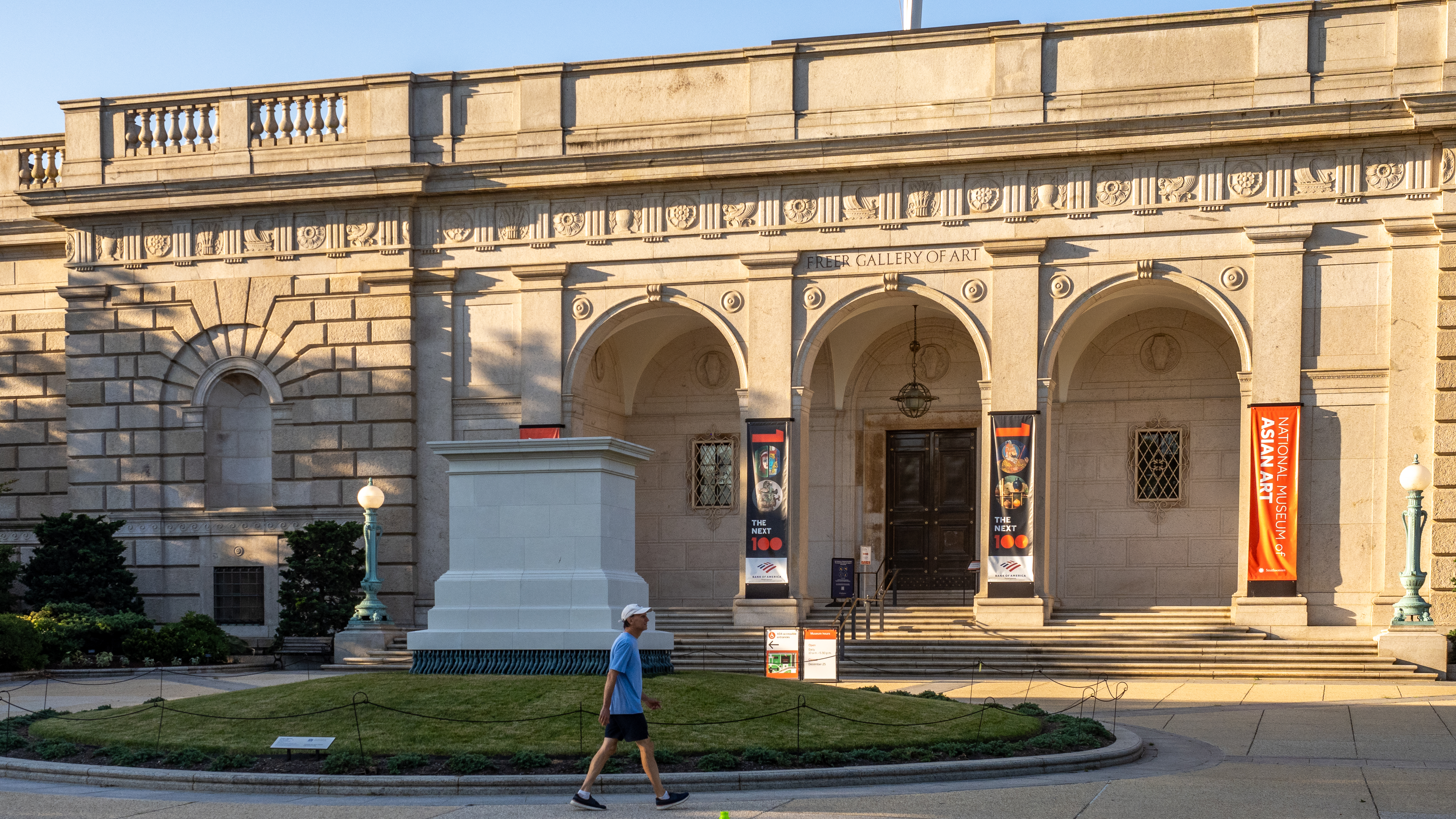
- Front entrance to the Freer Gallery of Art
- Built: 1923
- Architect: Platt, Charles A.
- Architectural style: Late 19th and 20th century revivals, Florentine Renaissance
- NRHP reference No.: 69000295
- Added to NRHP: June 23, 1969

The Freer Gallery of Art is an art museum of the Smithsonian Institution in Washington, D.C. focusing on Asian art. The Freer and the Arthur M. Sackler Gallery together form the National Museum of Asian Art in the United States. The Freer and Sackler galleries house the largest Asian art research library in the country and contain art from East Asia, South Asia, Southeast Asia, the Islamic world, the ancient Near East, and ancient Egypt, as well as a significant collection of American art.

The gallery is located on the south side of the National Mall in Washington, D.C., contiguous with the Sackler Gallery. The museum is open 364 days a year (being closed on Christmas), and is administered by a single staff with the Sackler Gallery. The galleries were among the most visited art museums in the world.

The Freer houses over 26,000 objects spanning 6,000 years of history from the Neolithic to modern eras. The collections include ancient Egyptian stone sculpture and wooden objects, ancient Near Eastern ceramics and metalware, Chinese paintings and ceramics, Korean pottery and porcelain, Japanese folding screens, Persian manuscripts, and Buddhist sculpture. In addition to Asian art, the Freer also contains the famous Harmony in Blue and Gold: The Peacock Room (better known as The Peacock Room) by American artist James McNeill Whistler which serves as the centerpiece to the Freer's American art collection.

The museum offers free tours to the public and presents a full schedule events for the public including films, lectures, symposia, concerts, performances, and discussions. Over 11,000 objects from the Freer|Sackler collections are fully searchable and available online. The Freer was also featured in the Google Art Project, which offers online viewers close-up views of selected items from the Freer.

== History ==
=== Founding ===
The gallery was founded by Detroit railroad-car manufacturer and self-taught connoisseur Charles Lang Freer. He owned a very large collection of works by American artist James McNeill Whistler (1834-1903) and became a patron and friend of the irascible artist. Whistler made it very clear to Freer that if he helped him to build the premier Whistler collection, then that collection would have to be displayed in a city where tourists went.

In 1908, Charles Moore, a former aide to Michigan United States Senator, James McMillin and the chairman of the United States Commission of Fine Arts, moved from Washington, D.C., to Detroit. Moore became friends with Freer, who was director of the Michigan Car Company, and persuaded Freer to permanently exhibit his 8,000-piece collection of Oriental art in Washington, D.C. Before then, Freer informally proposed to President Theodore Roosevelt that he give to the nation his art collection, funds to construct a building, and an endowment fund to provide for the study and acquisition of "very fine examples of Oriental, Egyptian, and Near Eastern fine arts."

The Freer gift was accepted on behalf of the government by the Smithsonian Board of Regents in 1906. Freer's will, however, contained certain requirements that only objects from the permanent collection could be exhibited in the gallery, and that none of the art could be exhibited elsewhere. Freer felt strongly that all of the museum's holding should be readily accessible to scholars at all times. In addition, Freer's bequest to the Smithsonian came with the proviso that he would execute full curatorial control over the collection until his death. The Smithsonian initially hesitated at the requirements but the intercession of President Theodore Roosevelt allowed for the project to proceed. The Freer Gallery possesses an autographed letter from Roosevelt inviting Freer to visit him at the White House, reflecting the personal interest Roosevelt showed in the development of the museum. Freer died before the art gallery was completed.

=== Construction and architecture ===
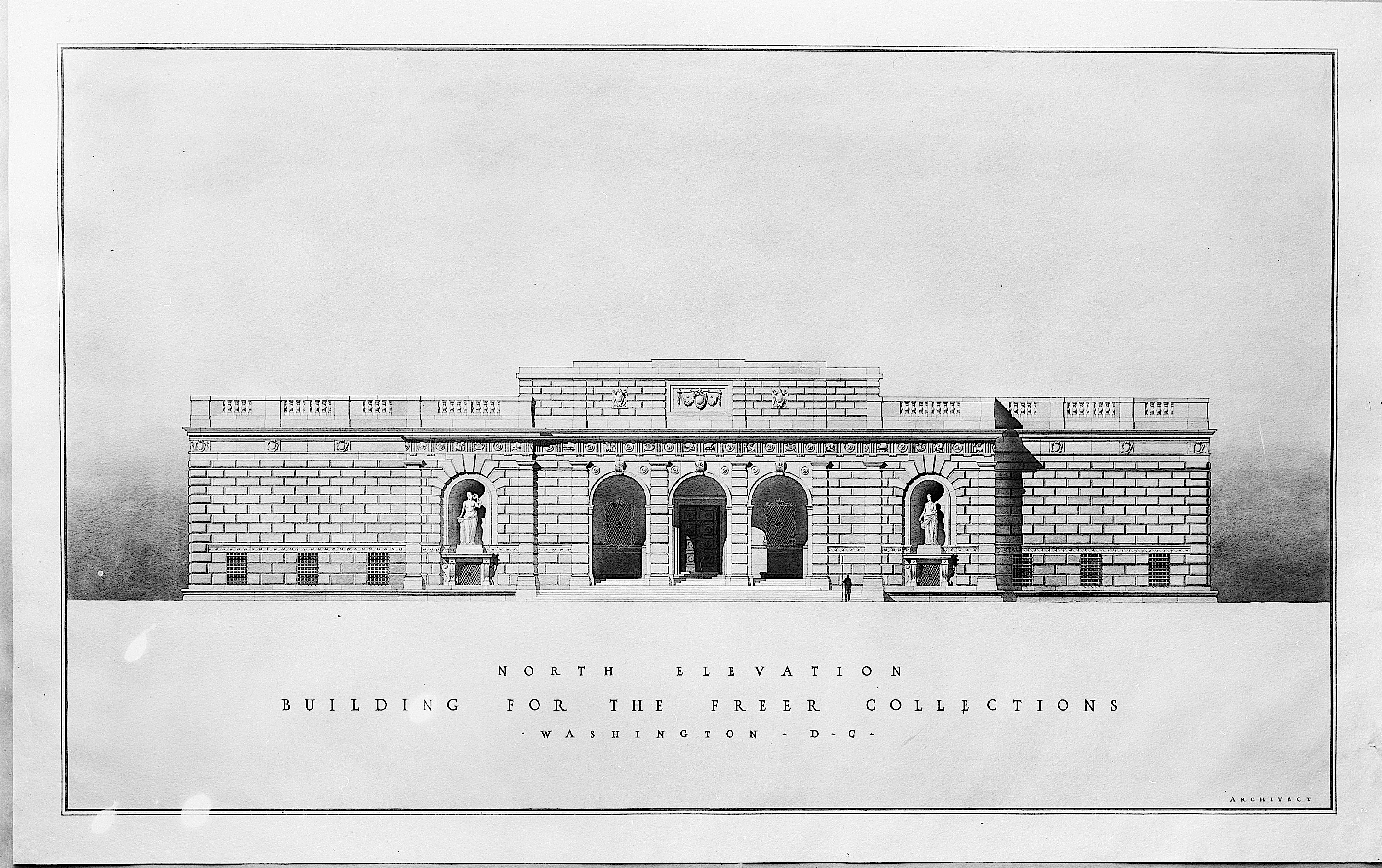
Drawing of the North Elevation

Construction of the gallery began in 1916 and was completed in 1921, after a delay due to World War I. On May 9, 1923, the Freer Gallery of Art was opened to the public. Designed by American architect and landscape planner Charles A. Platt, the Freer is an Italian Renaissance-style building inspired by Freer's visits to palazzos in Italy. It is reported that in a meeting with architect Charles Platt at the Plaza Hotel in New York City, Freer jotted down his ideas for a classical, well-proportioned building on a napkin. The gallery is constructed primarily of granite: the exterior of the Freer is pink granite quarried in Milford, Massachusetts, the courtyard has a carnelian granite fountain and walls of unpolished Tennessee white marble. The gallery's interior walls are Indiana limestone, and the floors are polished Tennessee marble.

A major renovation of the building, which culminated in a grand reopening in 1993, greatly expanded storage and exhibition space by connecting the Freer and the Arthur M. Sackler Gallery. With the addition of the connecting gallery, the Freer has 39,039 square feet (3,626.8 m^{2}) of public space. The original structure designed by Platt remains intact, including the Eugene and Agnes E. Meyer Auditorium which serves as the venue for many public programs.

=== Current ===
After opening in 1923, the Freer served as the Smithsonian's first museum dedicated to the fine arts. The Freer was also the first Smithsonian museum created from a private collector's bequest. Through the years, the collections have grown through gifts and purchases to nearly triple the size of Freer's original donation: nearly 18,000 works of Asian art have been added since Freer's death in 1919.

The Freer is now connected by an underground exhibition space to the neighboring Arthur M. Sackler Gallery. Although their collections are stored and exhibited separately, the two museums share a director, administration, and staff. The Freer closed for extensive renovations in January 2016 and reopened in October 2017.

== Exhibitions ==
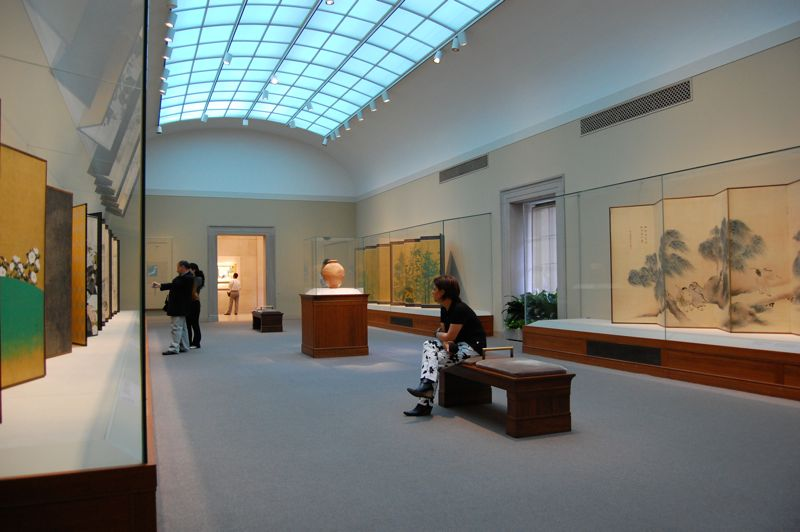

Because one of the main conditions of Charles Lang Freer donation stated that only items from his collection may be exhibited at the gallery, the Freer does not borrow from or lend out items to other institutions. However, due to the 26,000 objects in the gallery's collections, they are still able to present exhibitions internationally recognized for both depth and quality.

The Freer also has a number of rotating/temporary exhibits.

== American art at the Freer ==
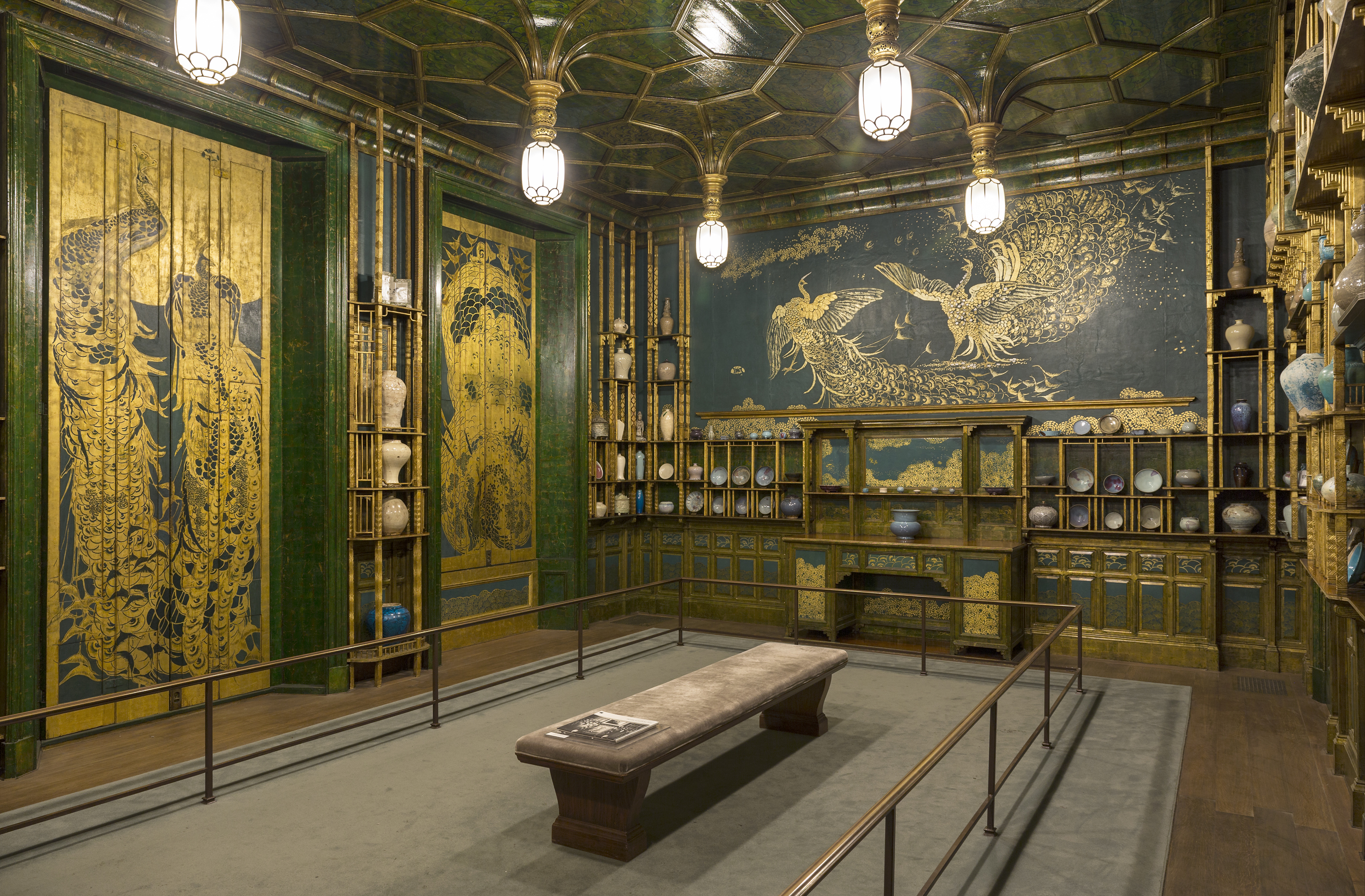
The Peacock Room by Whistler

Freer began collecting American art in the 1880s. In 1890, after meeting James Abbott McNeill Whistler, an American artist influenced by Japanese prints and Chinese ceramics, Freer began to expand his collections to include Asian art. He maintained his interest in American art, however, amassing a collection of over 1,300 works by Whistler, which is considered the world's finest.

One of the most well-known exhibits at the Freer is The Peacock Room, an opulent London dining room painted by Whistler in 1876–77. The room was designed for British shipping magnate F. R. Leyland and is lavishly decorated with green and gold peacock motifs. Purchased by Freer in 1904 and installed in the Freer Gallery after his death, The Peacock Room is on permanent display. During its time in the Freer Gallery, the Peacock Room underwent large-scale conservation projects in the 1940s and the early 1990s, and a major restoration in the summer of 2022.

The Freer also has works by Thomas Dewing (1851–1938), Dwight Tryon (1849–1925), Abbott Handerson Thayer (1849–1921), Childe Hassam (1859–1935), Winslow Homer (1836–1910), Augustus Saint-Gaudens (1848–1907), Willard Metcalf (1858–1925), John Singer Sargent (1856–1925), and John Twachtman (1853–1902).

== F|S Online ==
The Freer|Sackler provides several online resources for exploring the art and culture of Asia and its American art collections. Besides the collections objects viewable online, thousands of photographs, archeological diaries, maps, and archaeological squeezes (impressions of carvings) have been digitized and are used by researchers from around the world.

== F|S Archives and Library ==
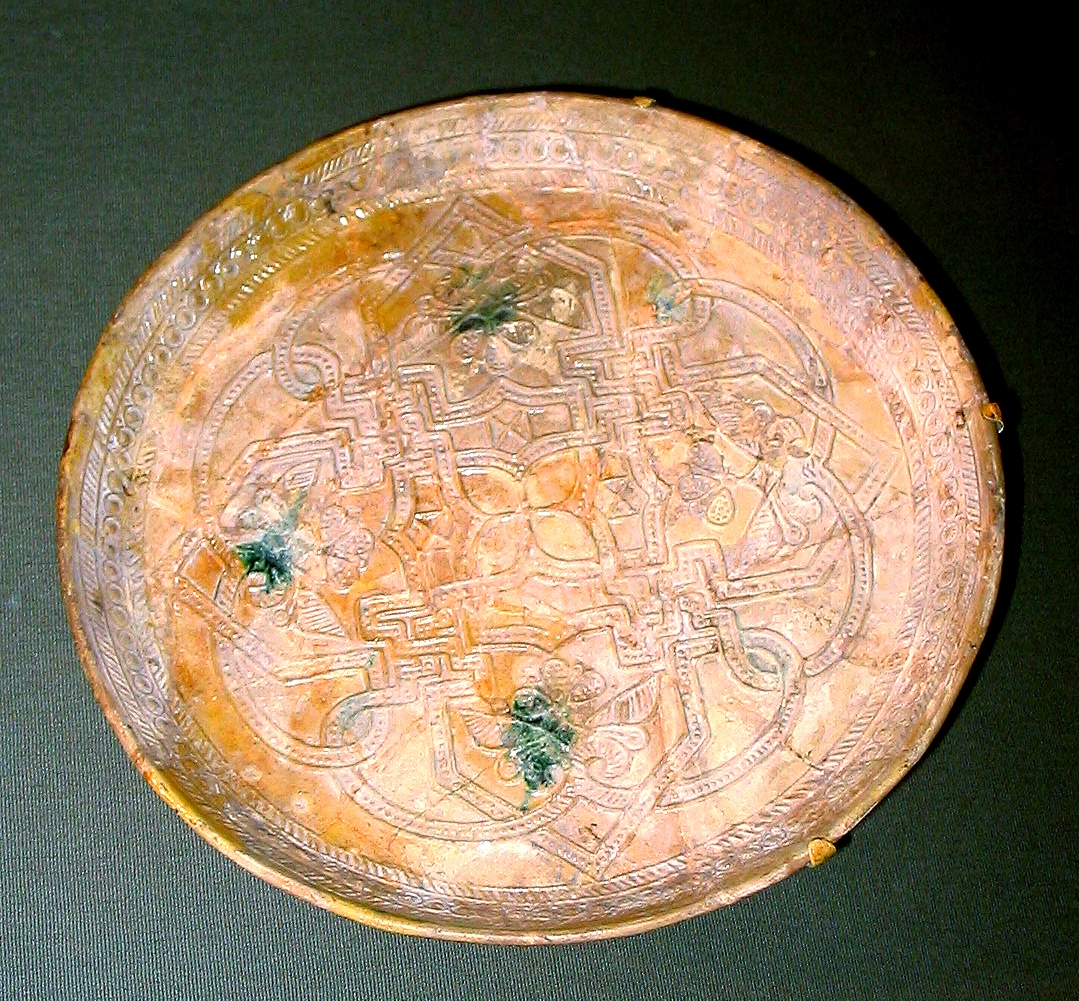
This earthenware dish from 9th century Abbasid, Iraq is one of the many artifacts exhibited at the Freer Gallery.

The Freer Sackler Archives houses over 120 important manuscripts collections relevant to the study of America's encounter with Asian art and culture. The core collection is the personal papers of gallery founder Charles Lang Freer, which includes his purchase records, diaries, and personal correspondence with public figures such as artists, dealers and collectors. Freer's extensive correspondence with James McNeill Whistler forms one of the largest sources of primary documents about the American artist. Other significant collections in the Archives includes the papers (notebooks, letters, photography, squeezes) and personal objects of the German archaeologist Ernst Herzfeld (1879–1946), documenting his research at Samarra, Persepolis and Pasargadae. The papers of Carl Whiting Bishop Dwight William Tryon, Myron Bement Smith, Benjamin March and Henri Vever are also located at the Archives. The Archives also holds over 125,000 photographs of Asia dating from the 19th and early 20th centuries. Highlights of photographic holdings include the Henry and Nancy Rosin Collection of 19th century photography of Japan, the 1903-1904 photographs of the Chinese Empress Dowager Cixi, and photographs of Iran by Antoin Sevruguin.

The Freer|Sackler Library is the largest Asian art research library in the United States. Open to the public five days a week (except federal holidays) without appointment, the library collection consists of more than 86,000 volumes, including nearly 2,000 rare books. Half the volumes are written and catalogued in Asian languages. Originating from the collection of four thousand monographs, periodical issues, offprints, and sales catalogues that Charles Lang Freer donated to the Smithsonian Institution as part of his gift to the nation, the F|S Library maintains the highest standards for collecting materials an active program of purchases, gifts, and exchanges.

In July 1987 the library moved to its new home in the Arthur M. Sackler Gallery. Today it supports activities of both museums, such as collection development, exhibition planning, publications, and other scholarly and educational projects. Its published and unpublished resources—in the fields of Asian art and archaeology, conservation, painting, sculpture, architecture, drawings, prints, manuscripts, books, and photography—are available to museum staff, outside researchers, and the visiting public.

== Public programs ==
The Eugene and Agnes E. Meyer Auditorium, named after American financier and publisher Eugene Meyer and journalist/social activist Agnes E. Meyer, is located in the Freer and provides a venue for a broad variety of free public programs. These programs include concerts of music and dance, lectures, chamber music, and dramatic presentations. It is also known for its film series, highlighting a wide variety of Asian cultures (including a Korean Film Festival and Iranian Film Festival).

Most recently, the museums began the series Asia After Dark, opening up the space for musicians, dancing, Asian cuisine, and other after-work adventures. The Freer and Sackler's 'We Stand With Japan' in 2011 hosted Steve Aoki.

Free drop-in tours are available daily and guide visitors through both featured exhibitions and specific themes in both the Freer and Sackler galleries, and a wide range of public lectures provide in-depth experiences with prominent artists and scholars.

== Conservation ==
Care of the collections began before the museum came into existence as Charles Lang Freer, the founder of the Freer Gallery of Art, hired Japanese painting restorers to care for his works and to prepare them for their eventual home as part of the Smithsonian Institution. In 1932, the Freer Gallery of Art hired a full-time Japanese restorer and established what was to become the East Asian Painting Conservation Studio. This facility remains one of the few in the United States that specializes in the conservation of Asian paintings. The Technical Laboratory was established in 1951 when chemist Rutherford J. Gettens moved from the Fogg Museum at Harvard University to the Freer. The laboratory was the first Smithsonian facility devoted to the use of scientific methods for the study of works of art. Over the years, the work of the Technical Laboratory expanded to include objects, paper, and exhibits conservation. The Technical Laboratory and the East Asian Painting Conservation Studio merged in 1990 to create the Department of Conservation and Scientific Research for both the Freer and Sackler Galleries.

The conservators in the Department of Conservation and Scientific Research care for and treat works of art in the collection and prepare them for exhibition. The department works to ensure long-term preservation and storage, safe handling, exhibition, and transport of artworks in the permanent collection, as well as those on loan. In addition, conservators are responsible for conducting technical examinations of objects already in the collection and those under consideration for acquisition. They also collaborate frequently with the department's scientists on technical and applied research. Training and professional outreach efforts are an integral part of the department's commitment to educating future conservators, museum professionals, and the public about conservation.

== Scholarship ==
The Freer has had a long tradition in serving as a center for inquiry and advanced scholarship about Asia. The Freer not only presents lectures and symposia to the public, but it also copublishes the Ars Orientalis with the University of Michigan Department of History of Art. Ars Orientalis is a peer-reviewed annual volume of scholarly articles and occasional reviews of books on the art and archaeology of Asia, the ancient Near East, and the Islamic world.

The Freer and Sackler, along with the Metropolitan Center for Far Eastern Art Studies in Kyoto, Japan, presents the Shimada Prize for distinguished scholarship in the history of East Asian art. The award was established in 1992 in honor of Professor Shimada Shujiro, by the Freer Gallery of Art and Arthur M. Sackler Gallery and by The Metropolitan Center for Far Eastern Art Studies in Kyoto, Japan. Several fellowships are also available to support graduate students and visiting scholars, including the Andrew W. Mellon Fellowship, Anne Van Biema Fellowship (Japanese Visual Arts), Iran Heritage Foundation (IHF) Fellowship (Persian art), Lunder Fellowship, J. S. Lee Memorial Fellowship (Chinese Art), Smithsonian Institution Fellowship, and the Freer Fellowship.

Freer and Sackler curators are also involved in dozens of ongoing research projects, often with colleagues from institutions around the world. The results of their work can be seen in a variety of published formats, including exhibition catalogues, scholarly publications, and online publications.

== Gallery ==
=== American Art ===
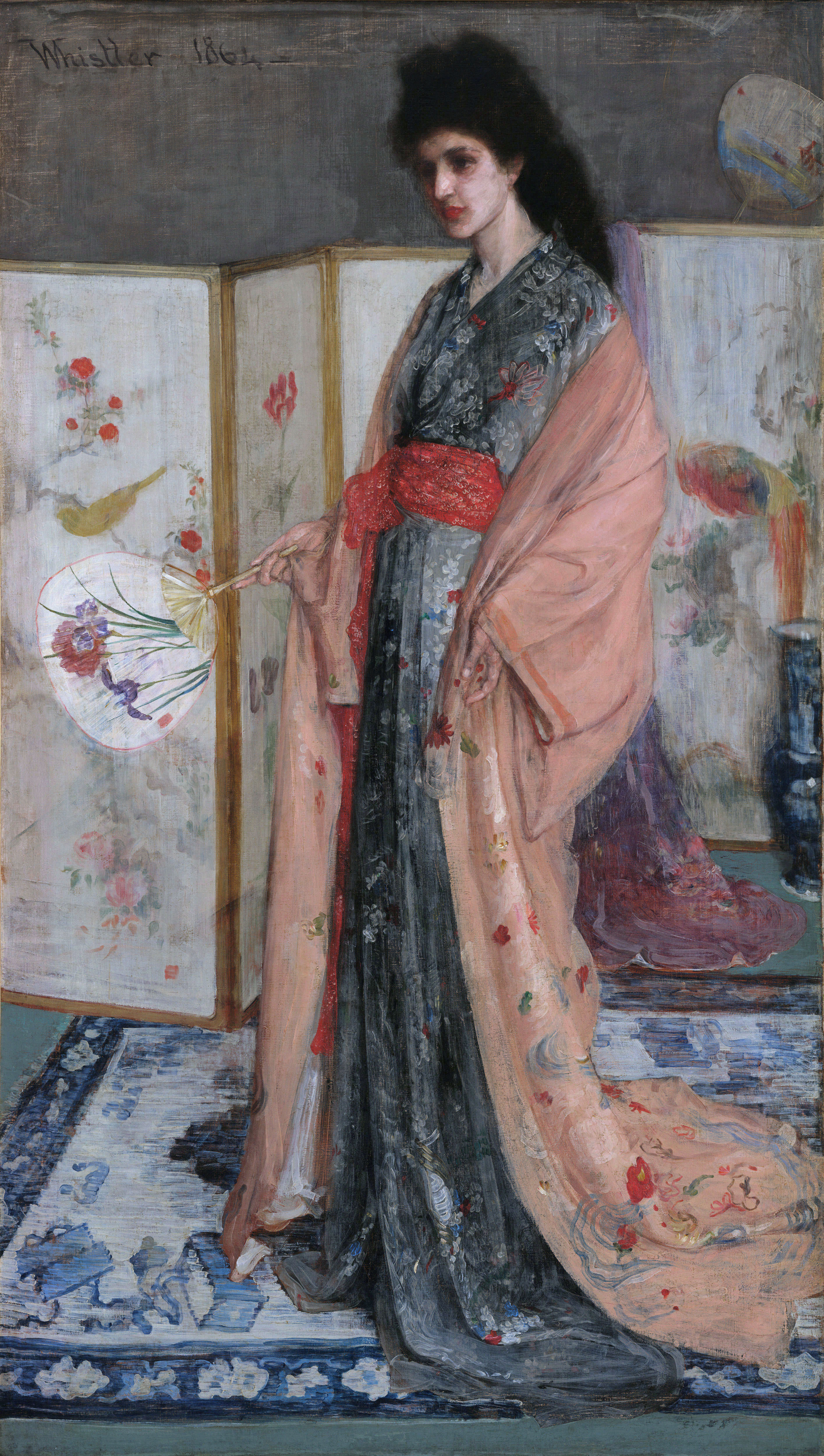
The Princess from the Land of Porcelain by James Abbott McNeill Whistler. Oil on canvas, 1863 - 1865

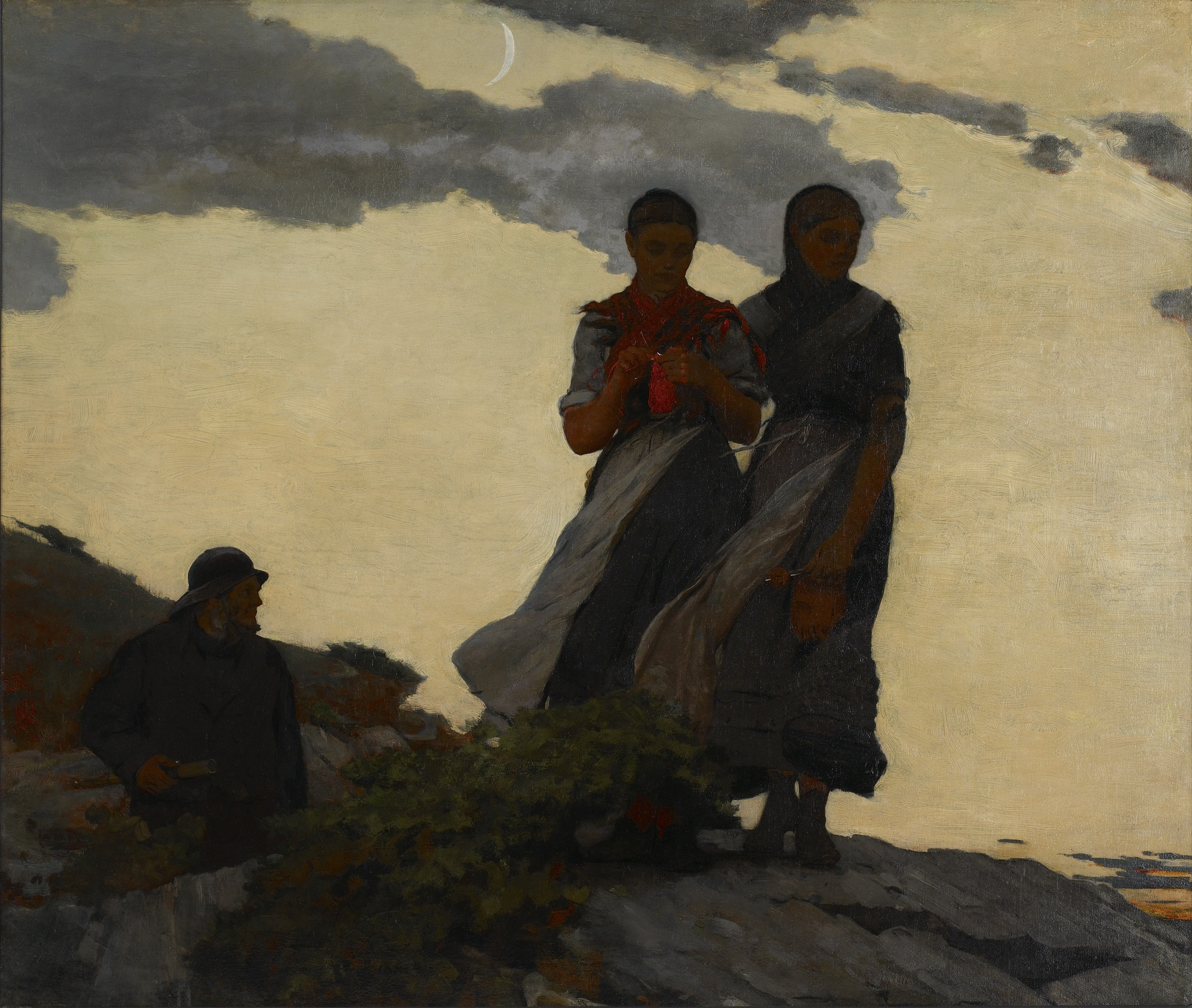
Early Evening by Winslow Homer. Oil on canvas, 1881

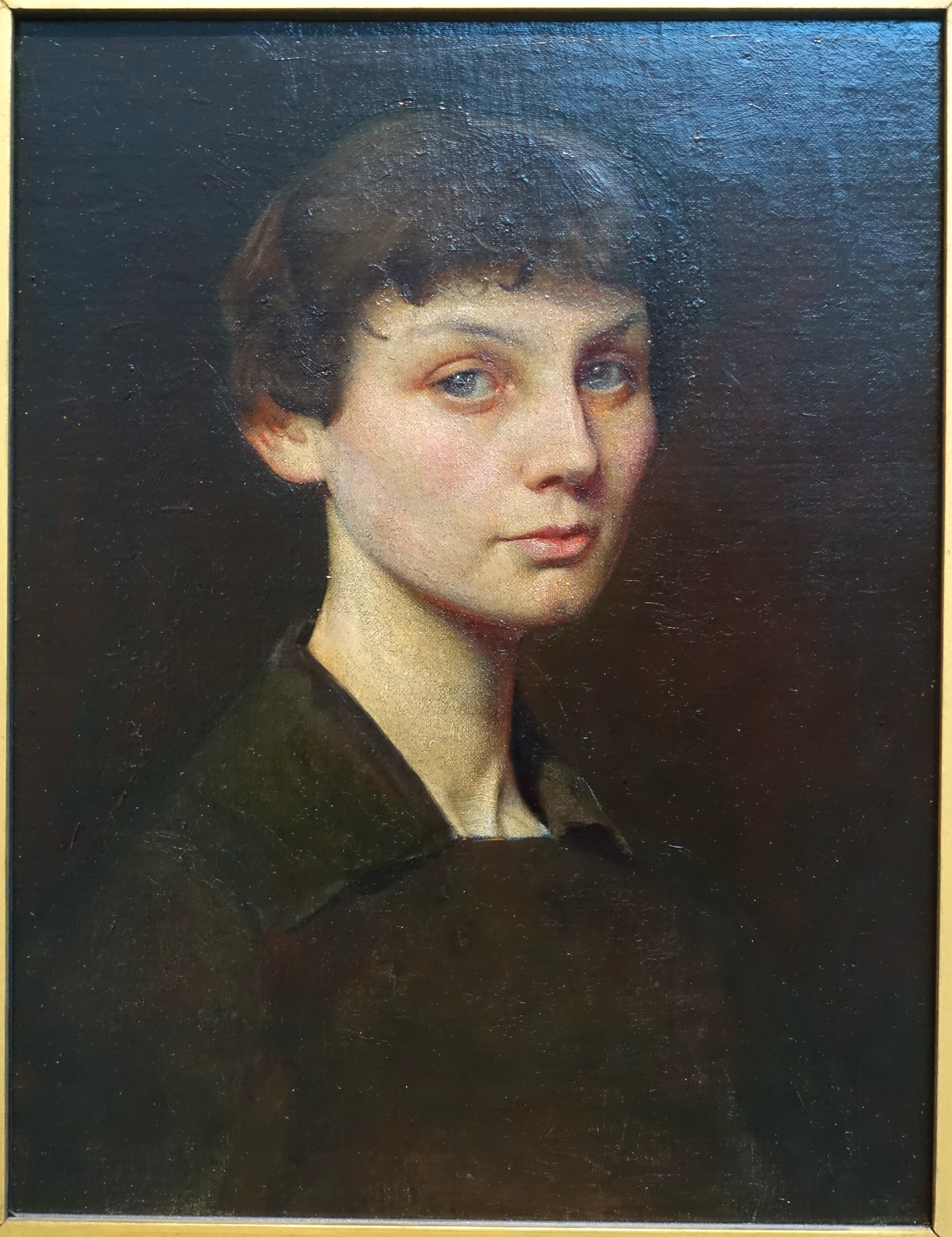
Portrait of Mrs. Brush, by George de Forest Brush. Oil on canvas, 1888

Breakfast in the Loggia by John Singer Sargent. Oil on canvas, 1910

=== Ancient Egyptian Art ===
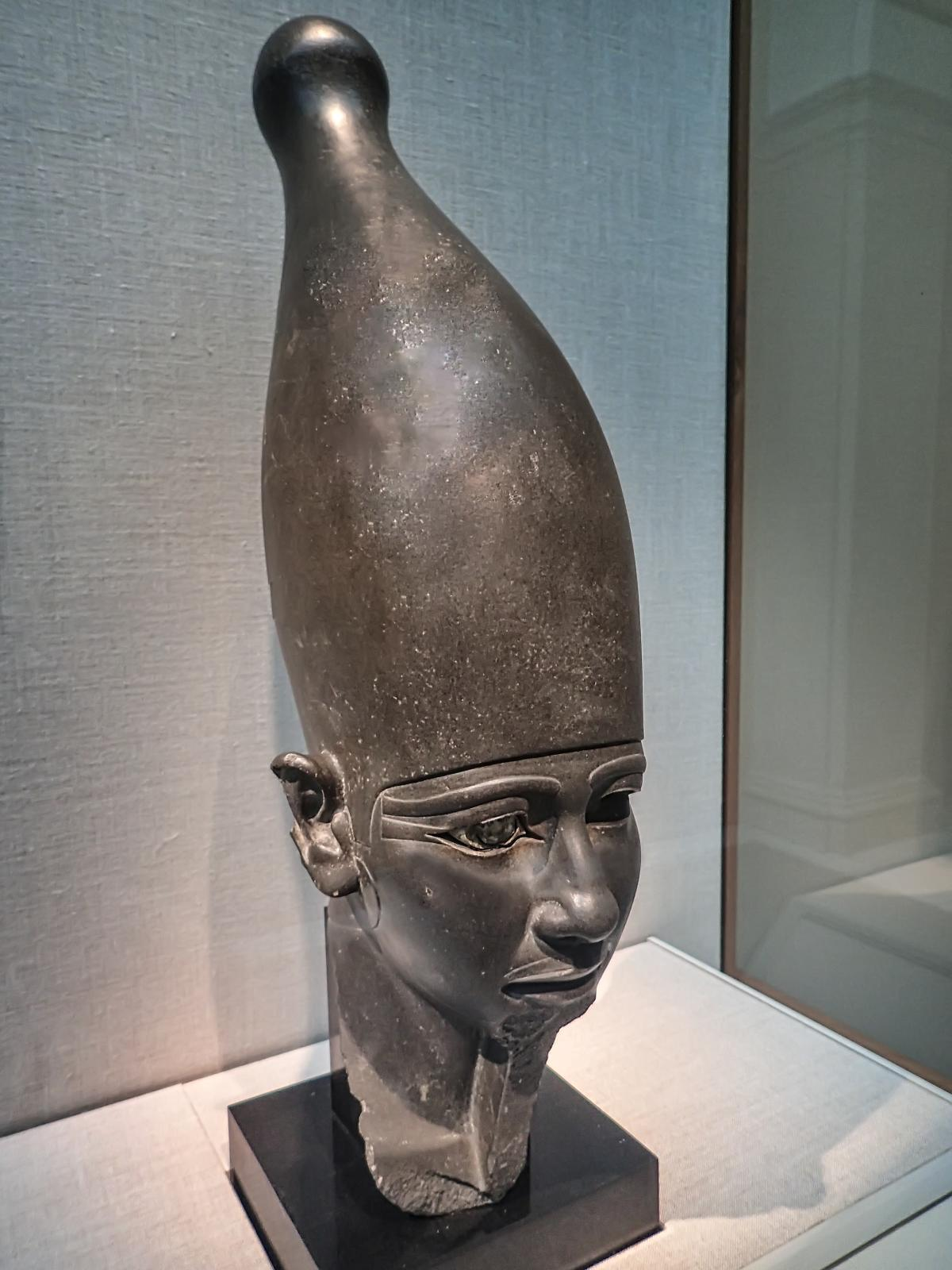
Head of a pharaoh wearing the White Crown (hedjet) of Upper Egypt. Diorite. Old Kingdom, 5th or 6th Dynasty (2494–2181 BC)

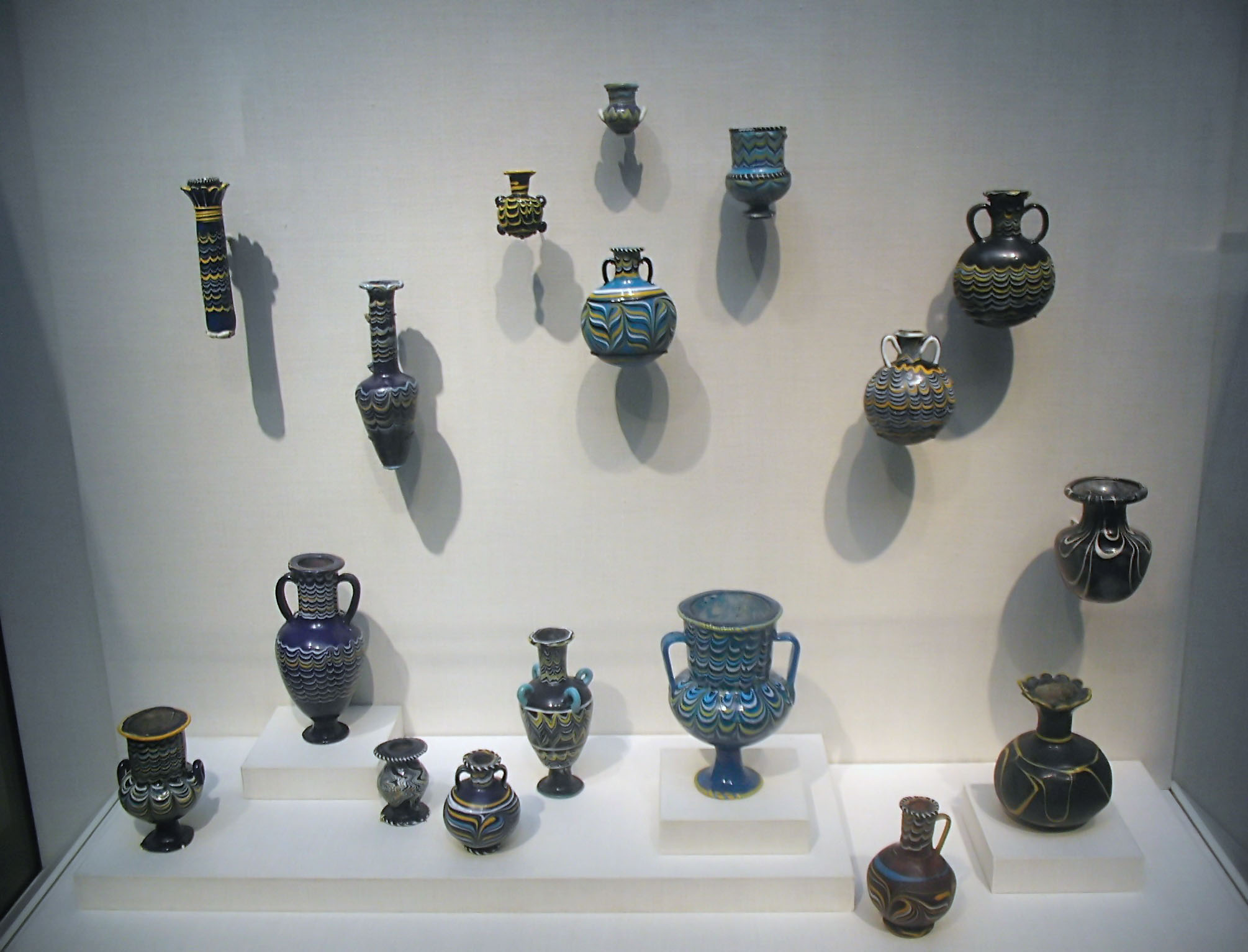
Miniature glassware vessels. New Kingdom, 18th Dynasty (1550–1307 BC)

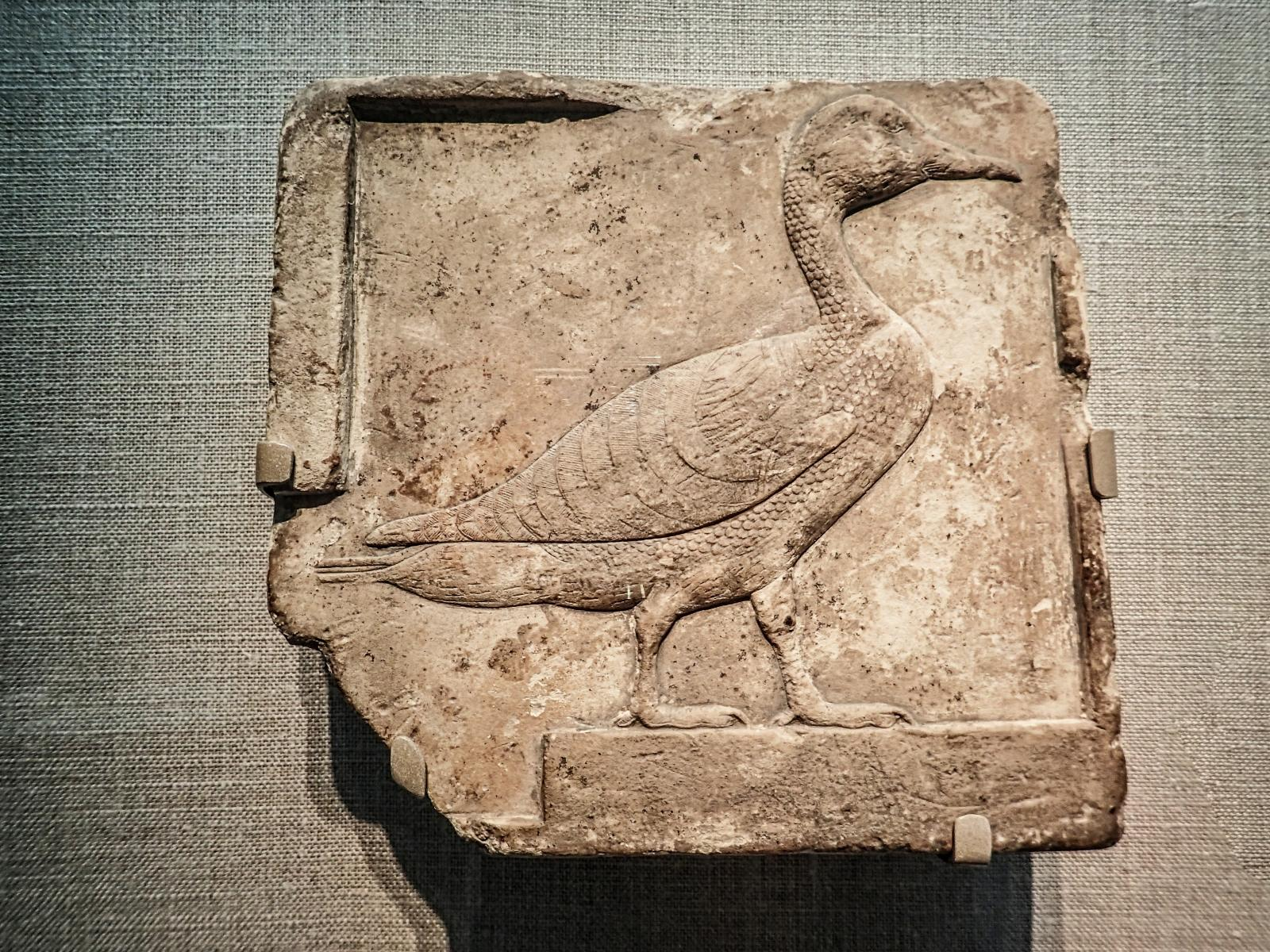
Plaque depicting a goose. Limestone. 26th Dynasty (664-525 BC)

=== Ancient Near Eastern Art ===
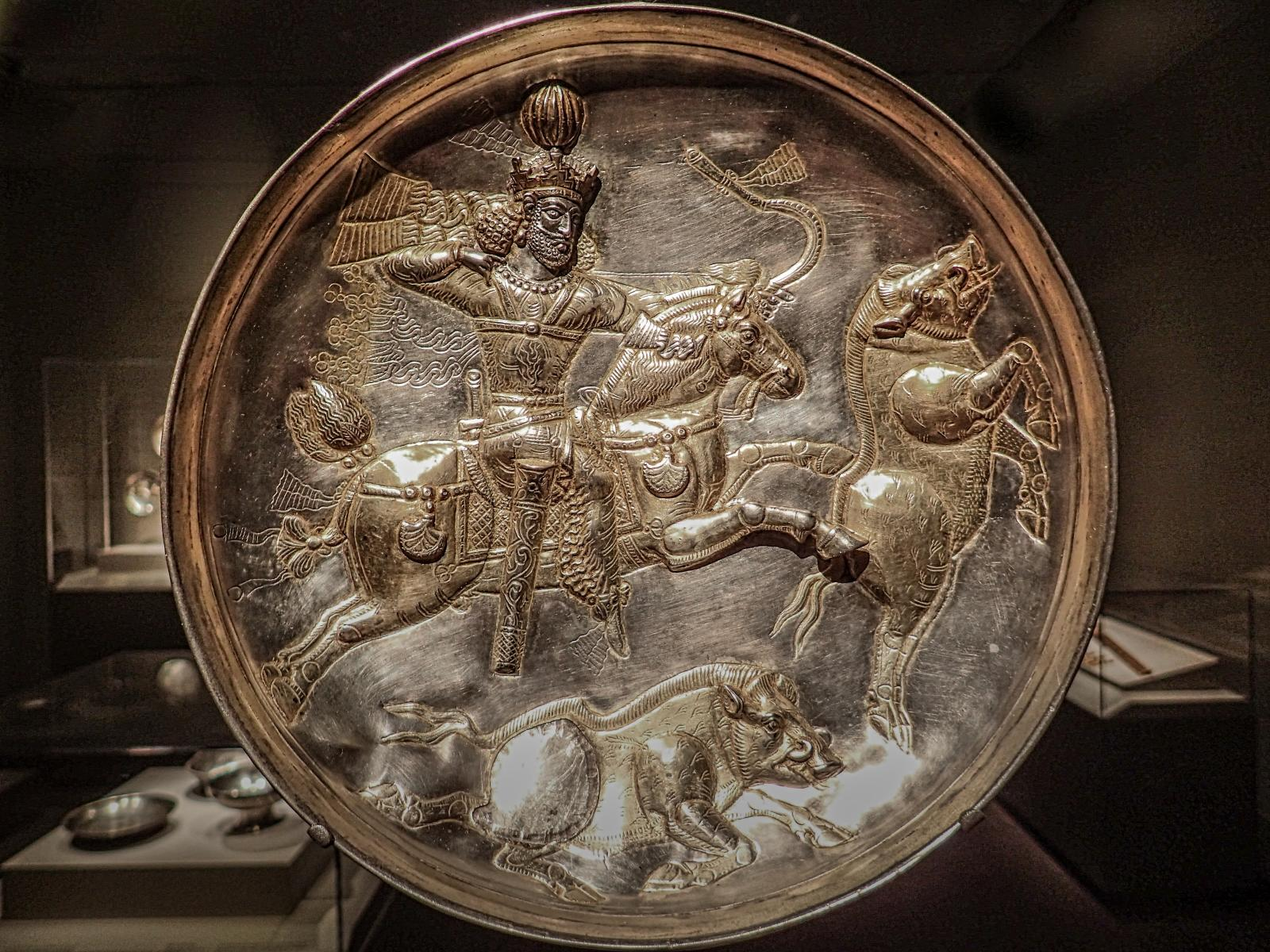
Shapur Hunting Plate. Silver and gilt. Sasanian Empire, reign of Shapur II (301-379)

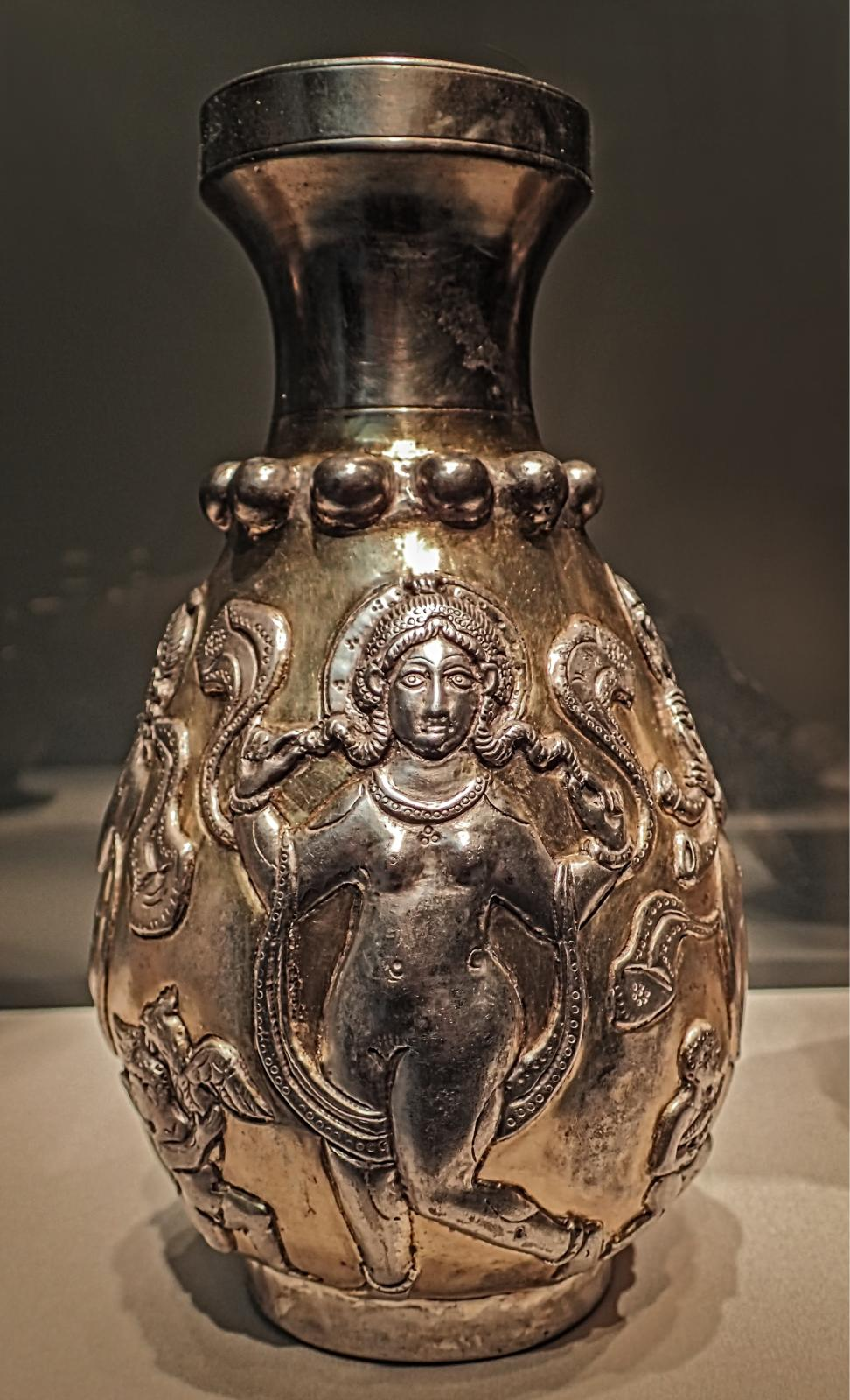
Vase decorated with figures of dancing females. Silver and gilt. Sasanian Empire, 6th - 7th century

=== Arts of the Islamic World ===
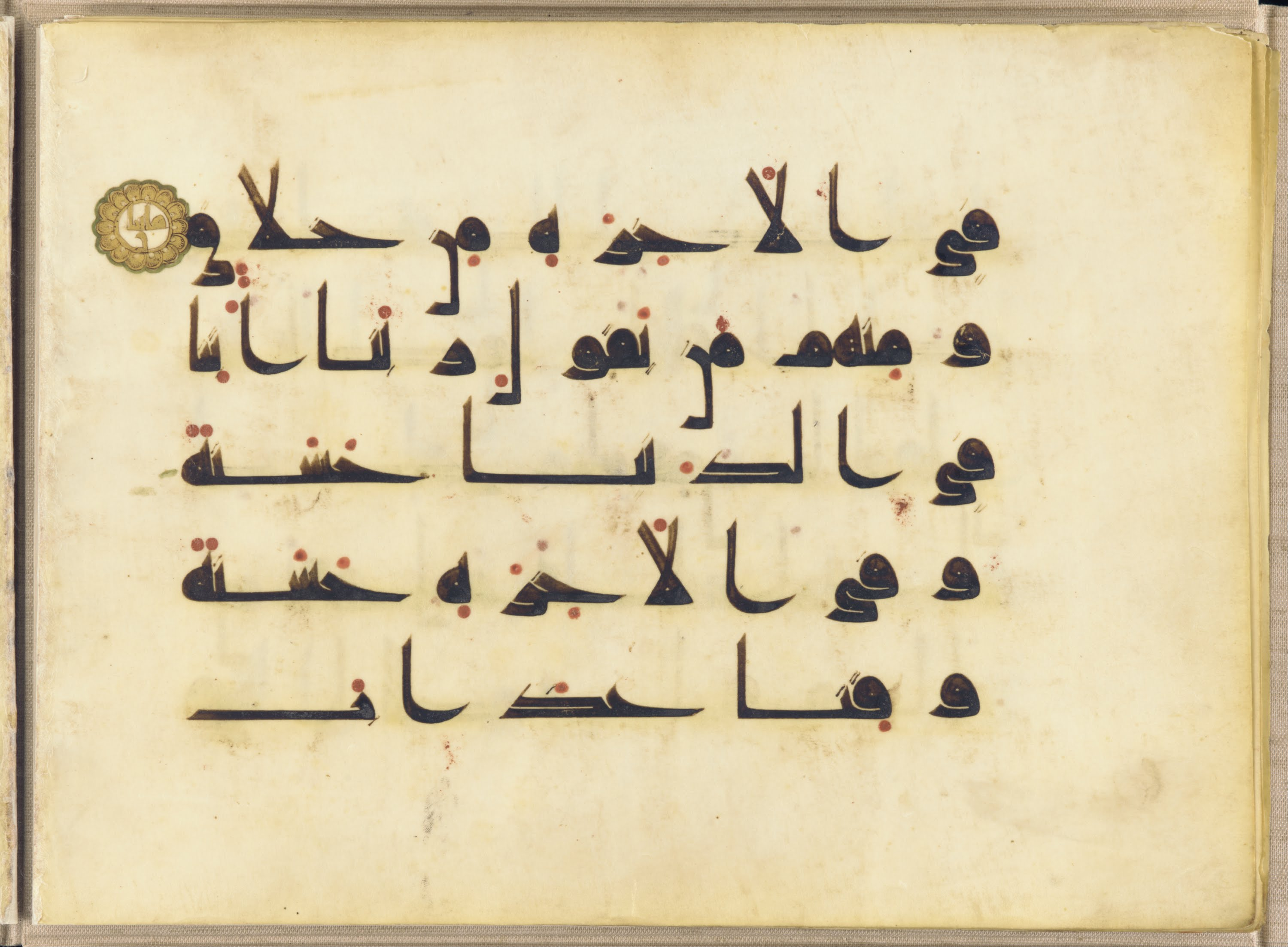
Folio from the Quran manuscript. Ink, color and gold on parchment. Abbasid period, 9th-10th century

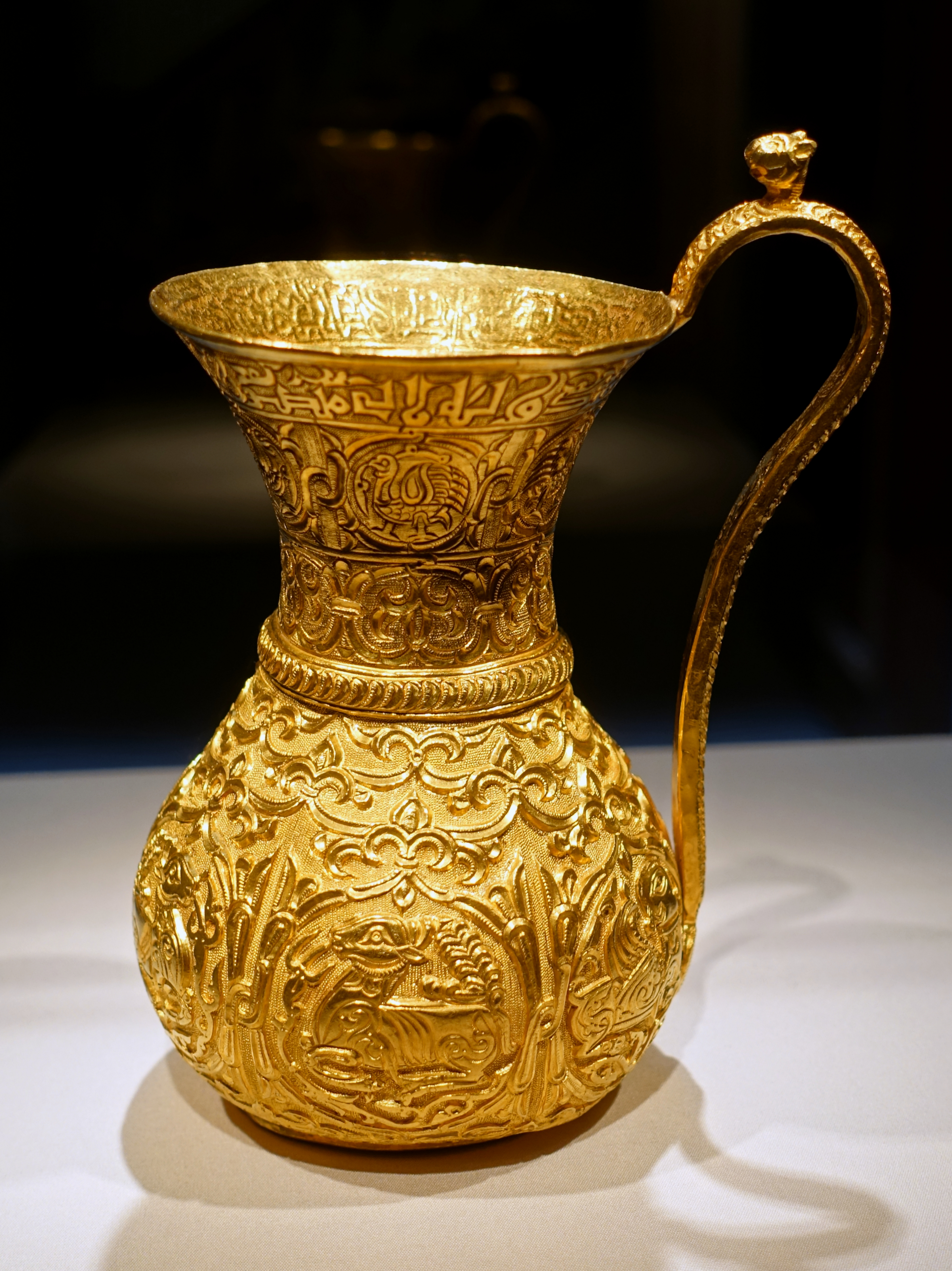
Golden Ewer inscribed with name and titles of Izz al-Dawla (r. 967 - 978)

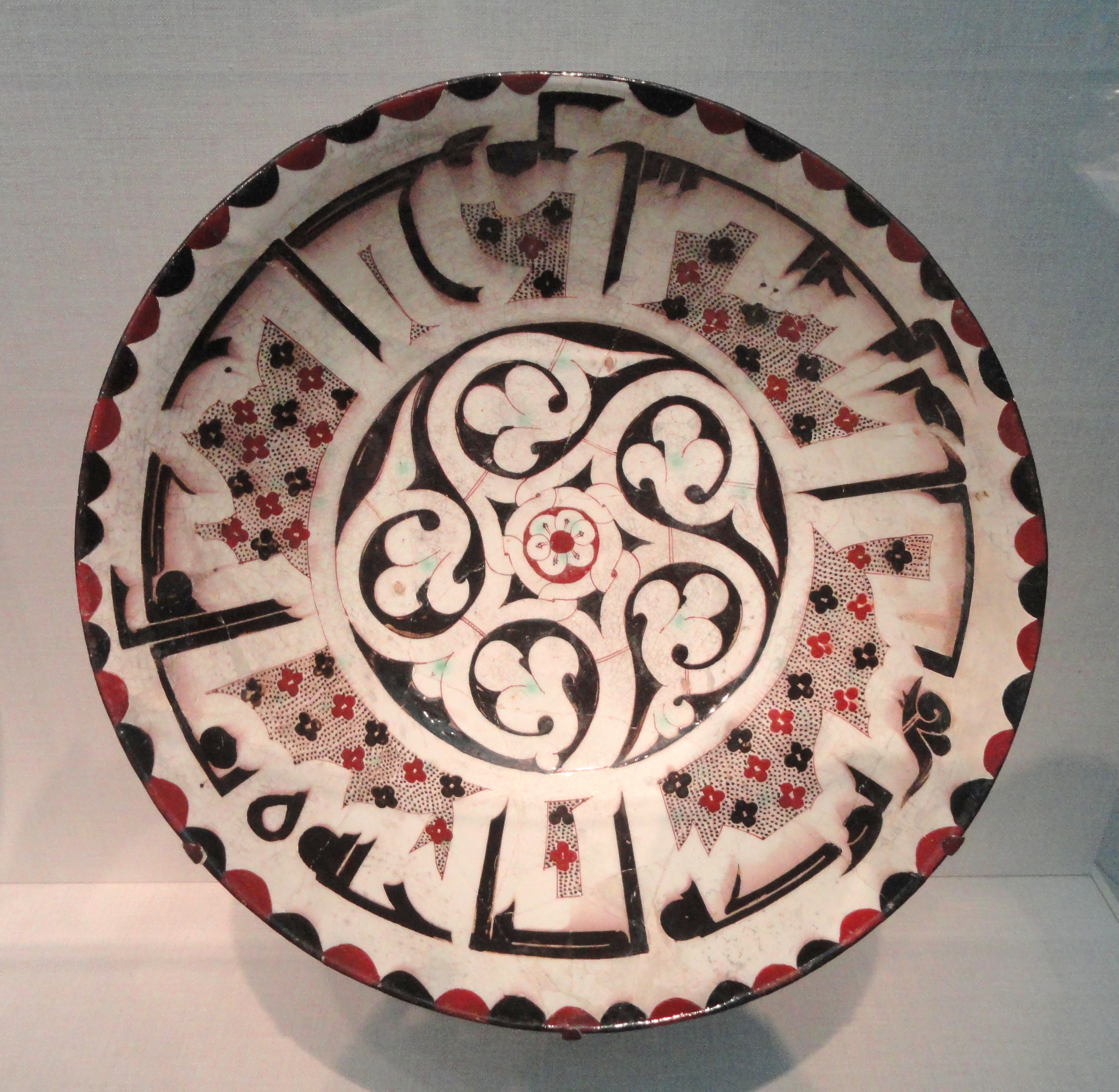
Samanid Bowl. Earthenware painted under glaze. 10th century

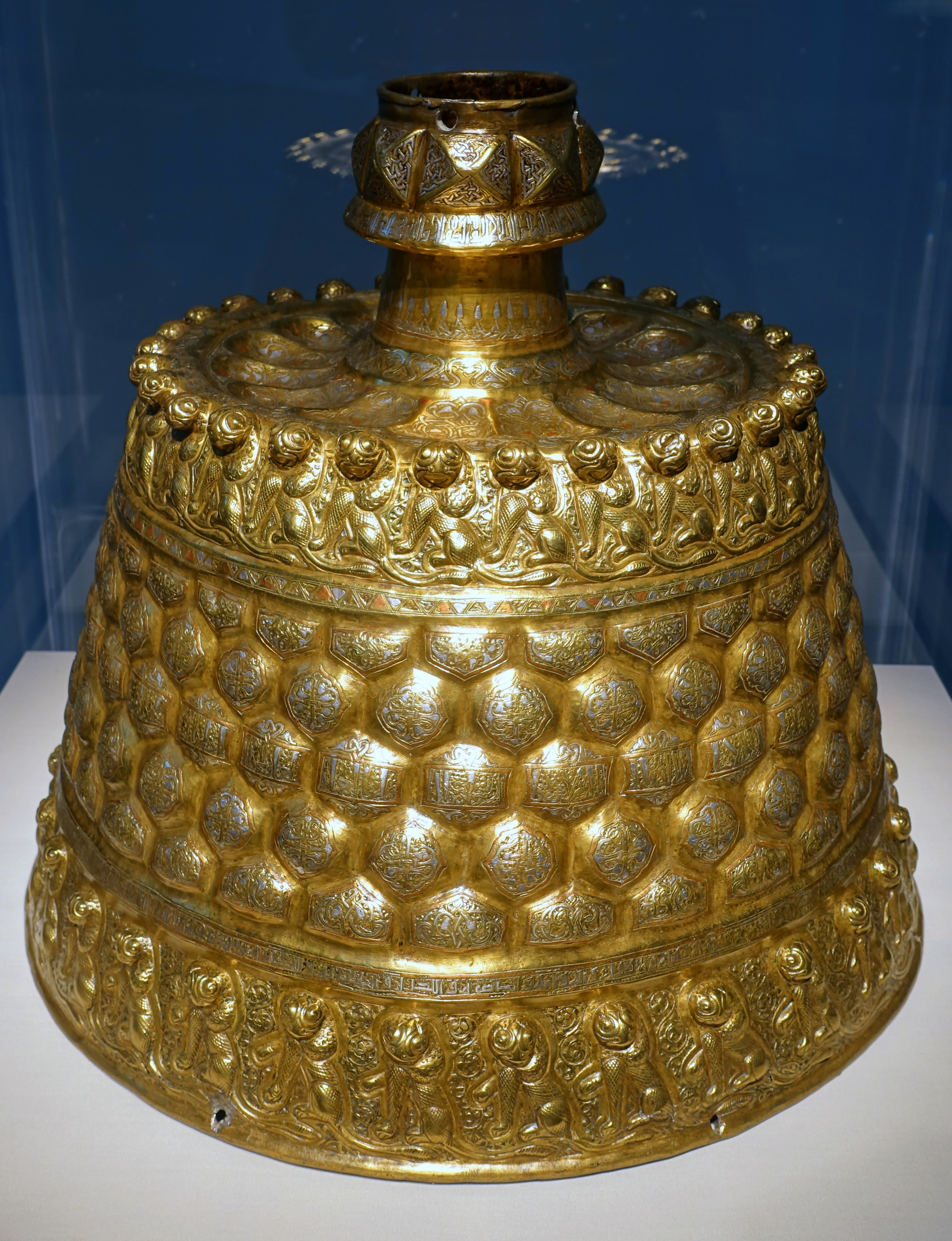
Candlestick. Brass inlaid with copper, silver, and black organic material. Seljuk period, c. 1150-1200.

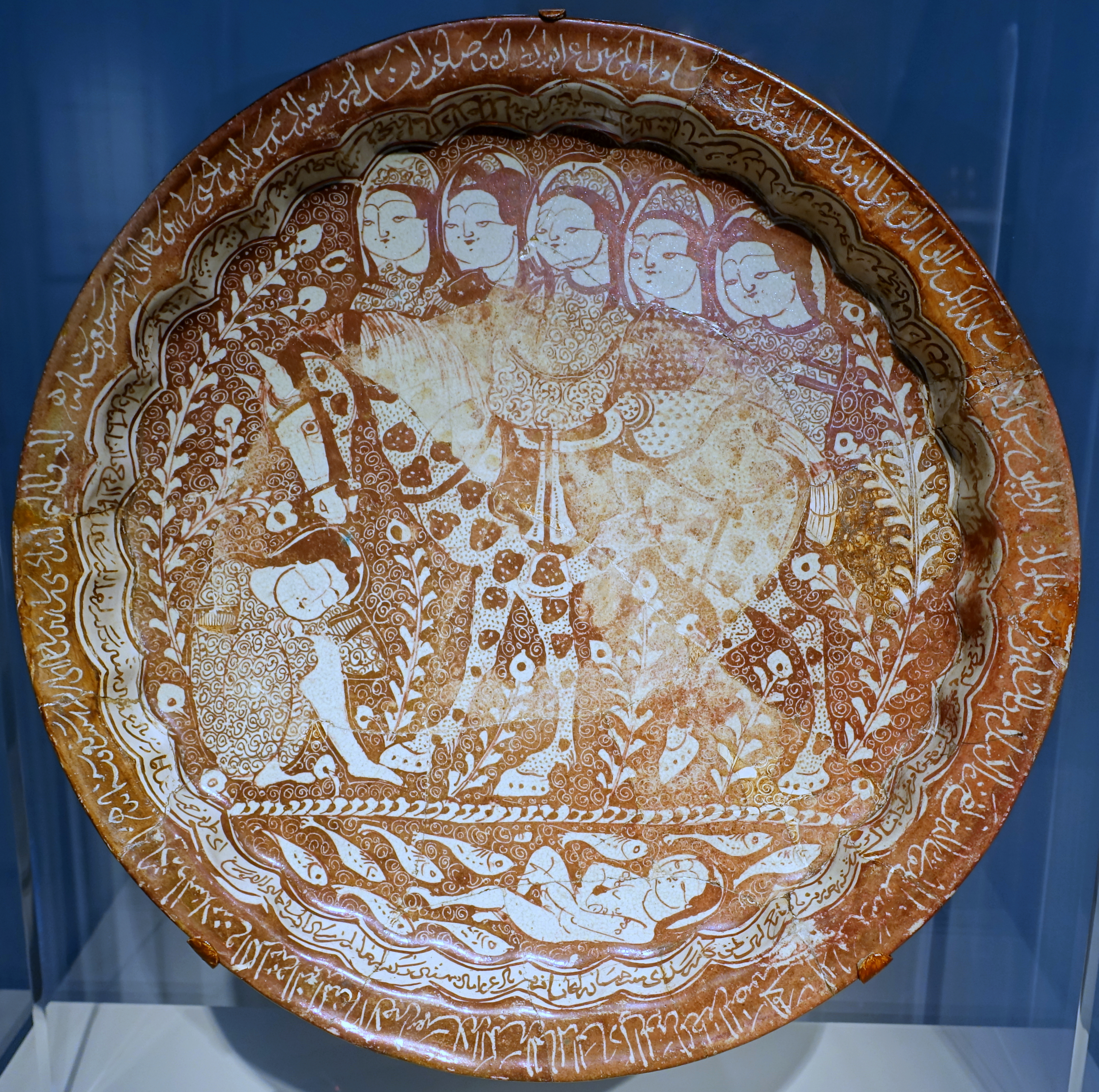
Plate made by Abu Zayd Kashani. Lustreware. Kashan, December 1210

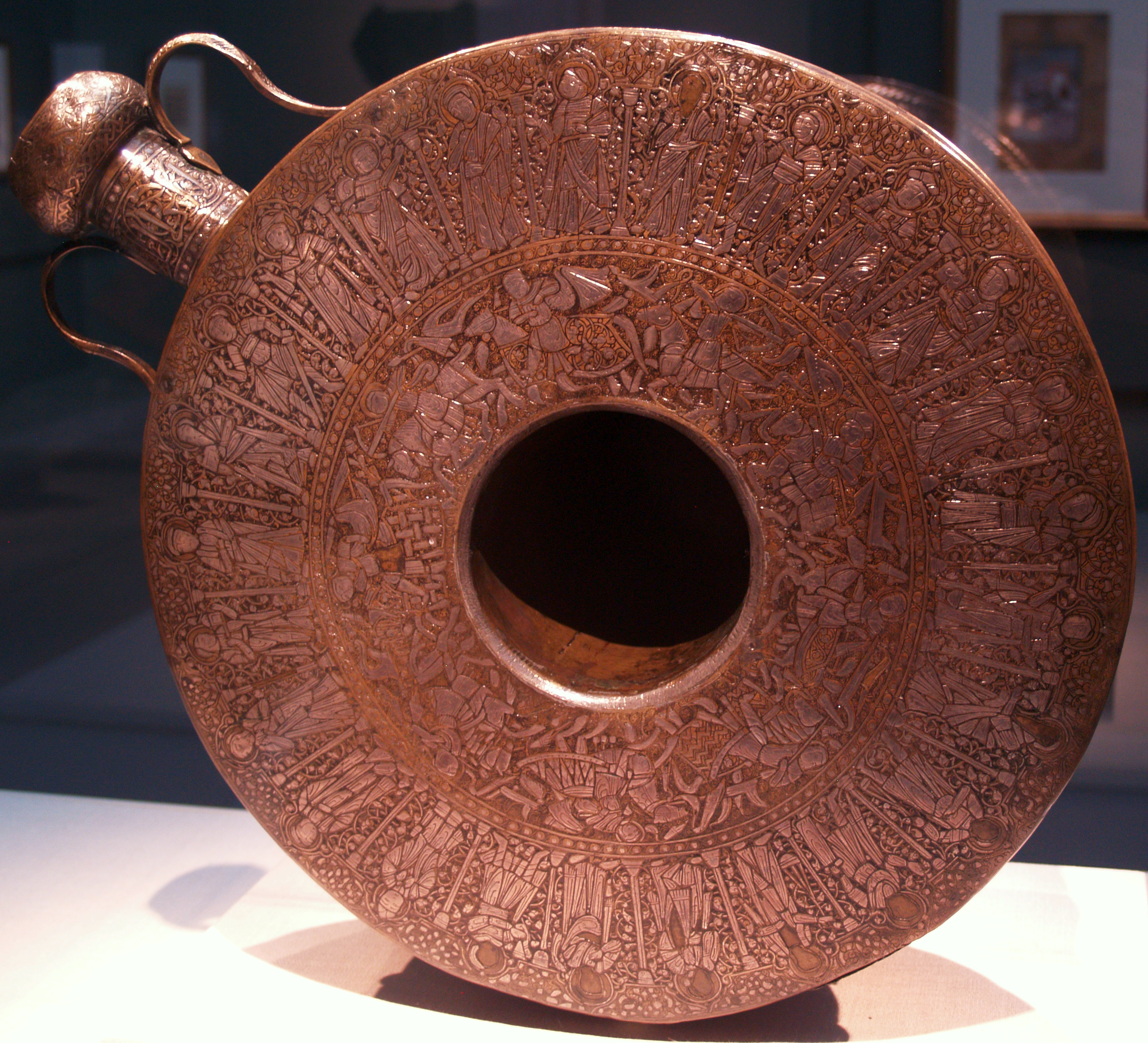
Canteen with the designs of both Christian and Islamic origin. Brass, silver inlay. Syria or Northern Iraq, mid-13th century

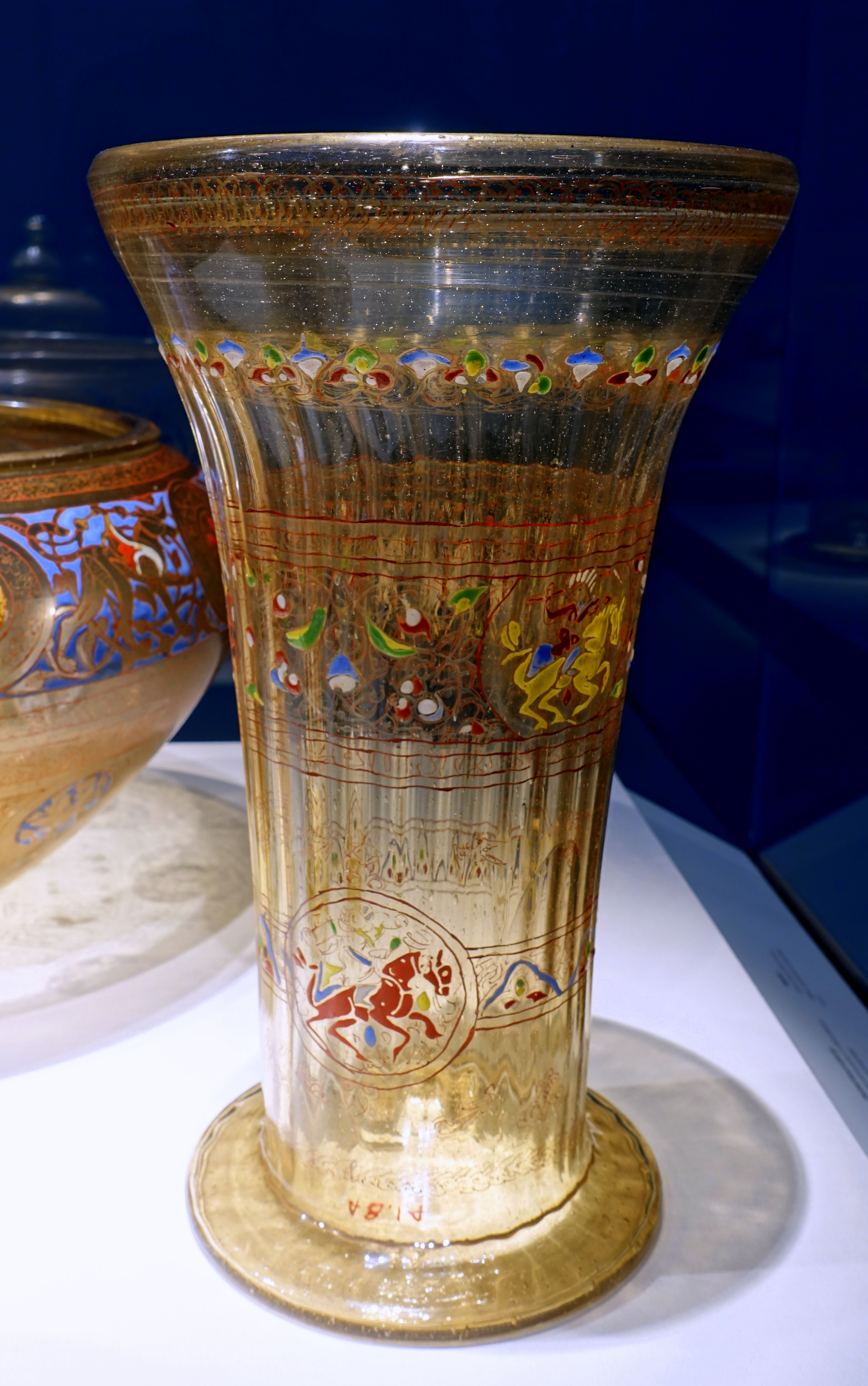
Beaker. Glass. Mamluk period, Syria, late 13th-century,

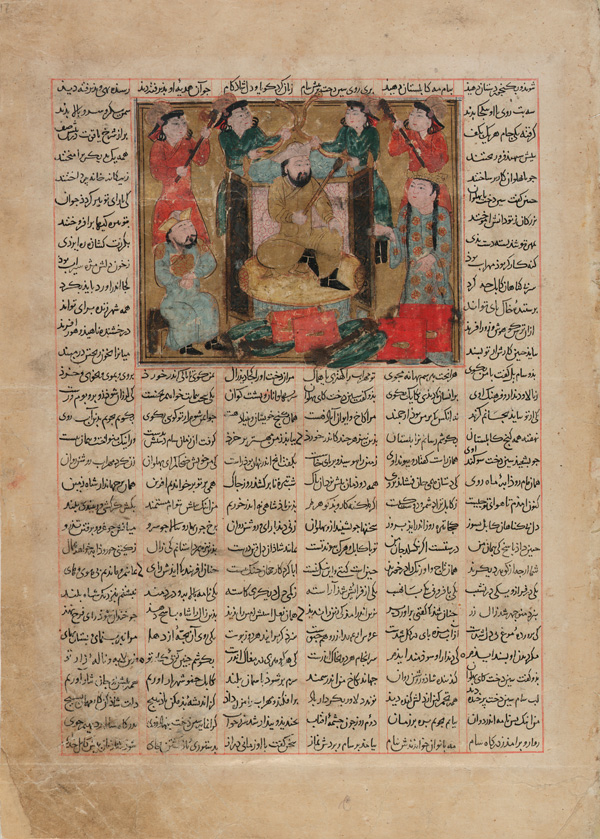
Sam granting an audience to Queen Sindukht, Folio from the "Freer Small Shahnama". Ilkhanid period, early 14th century

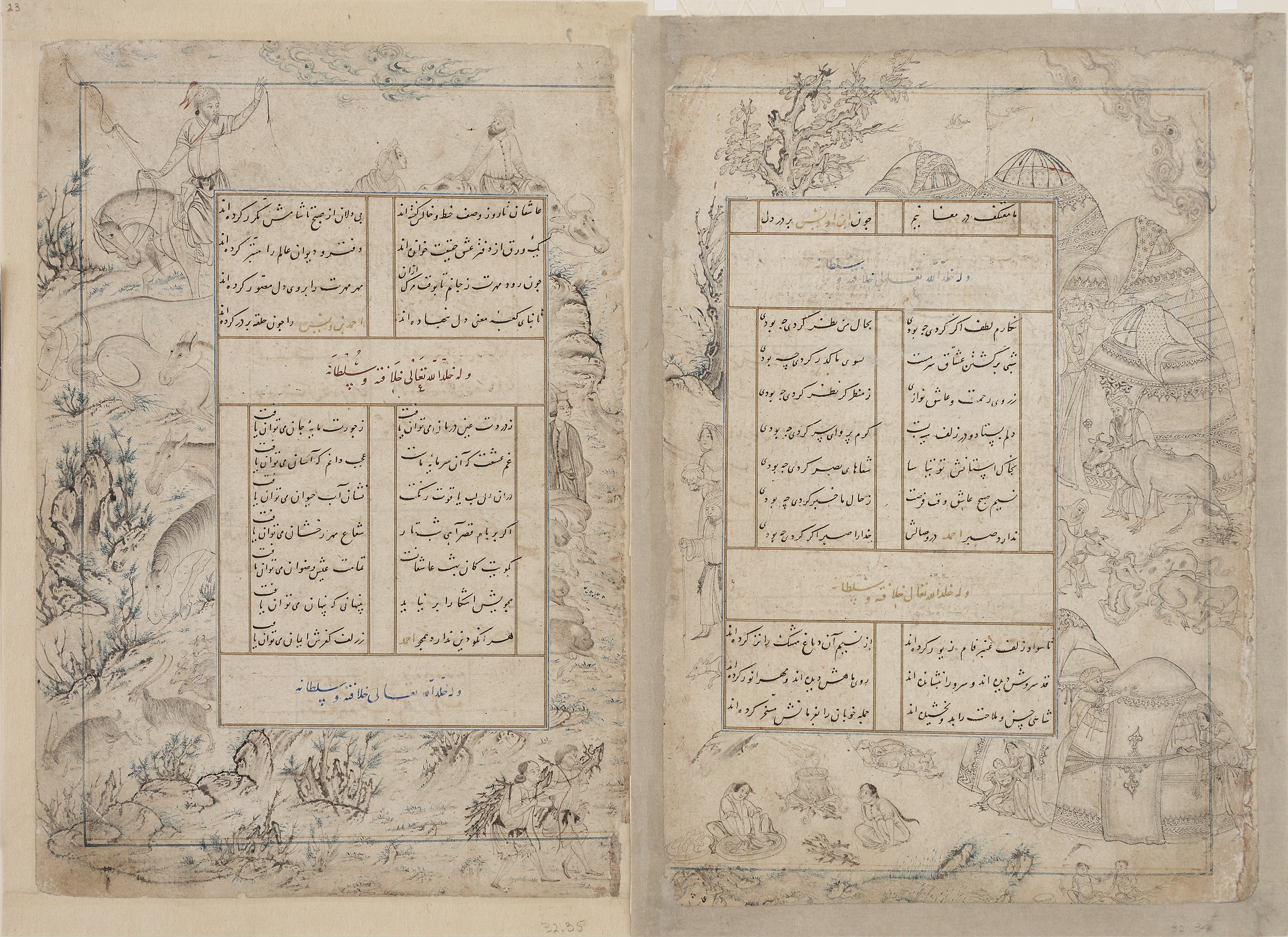
Folio from a Divan (collected poems) by Sultan Ahmad Jalayir, with calligraphy attributed to Mir Ali Tabrizi and drawings attributed to Abd al-Hayy. Jalayirid period, Baghdad or Tabriz, c. 1400

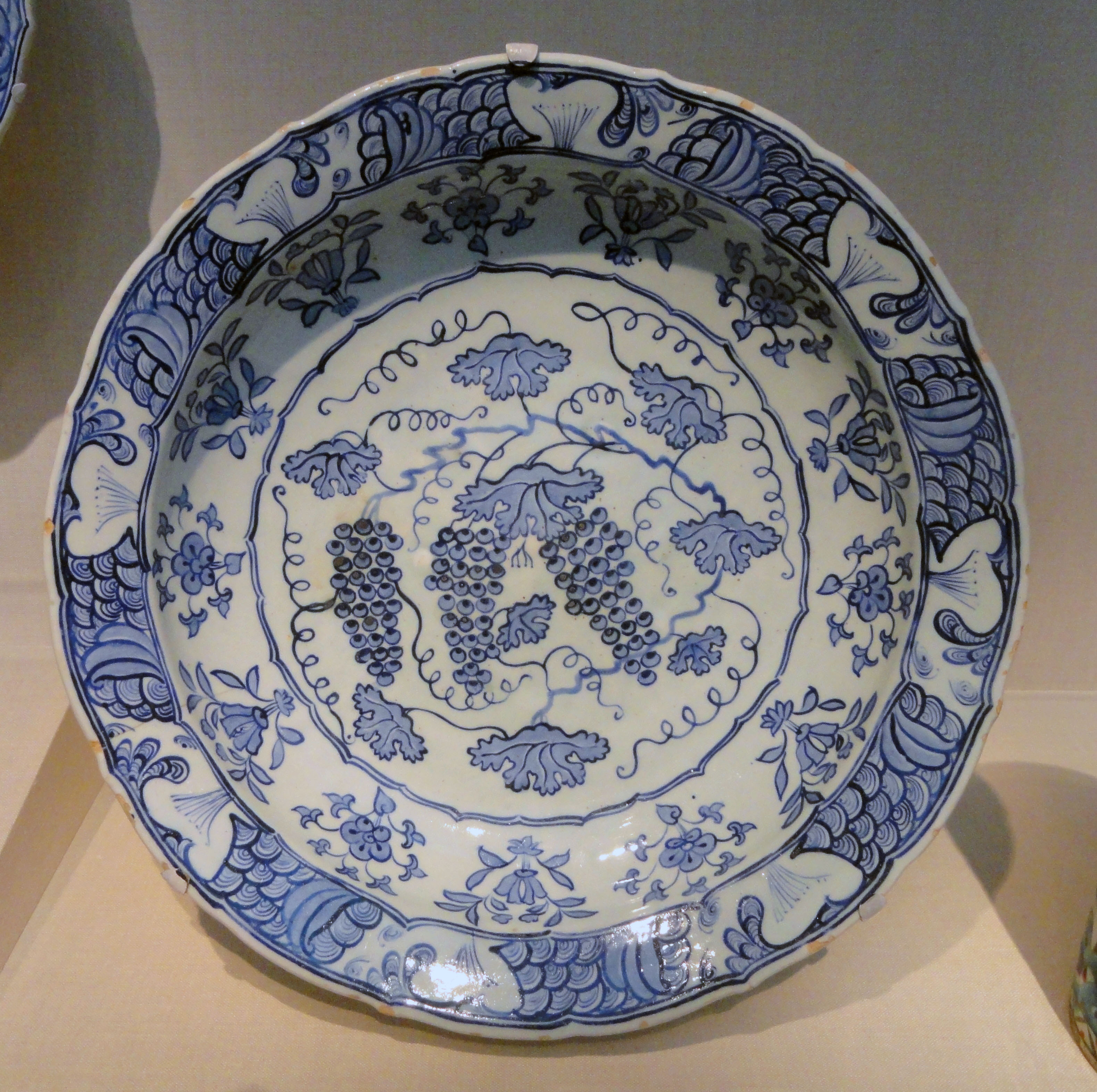
Plate. Iznik pottery. Ottoman period, İznik, early 16th century,

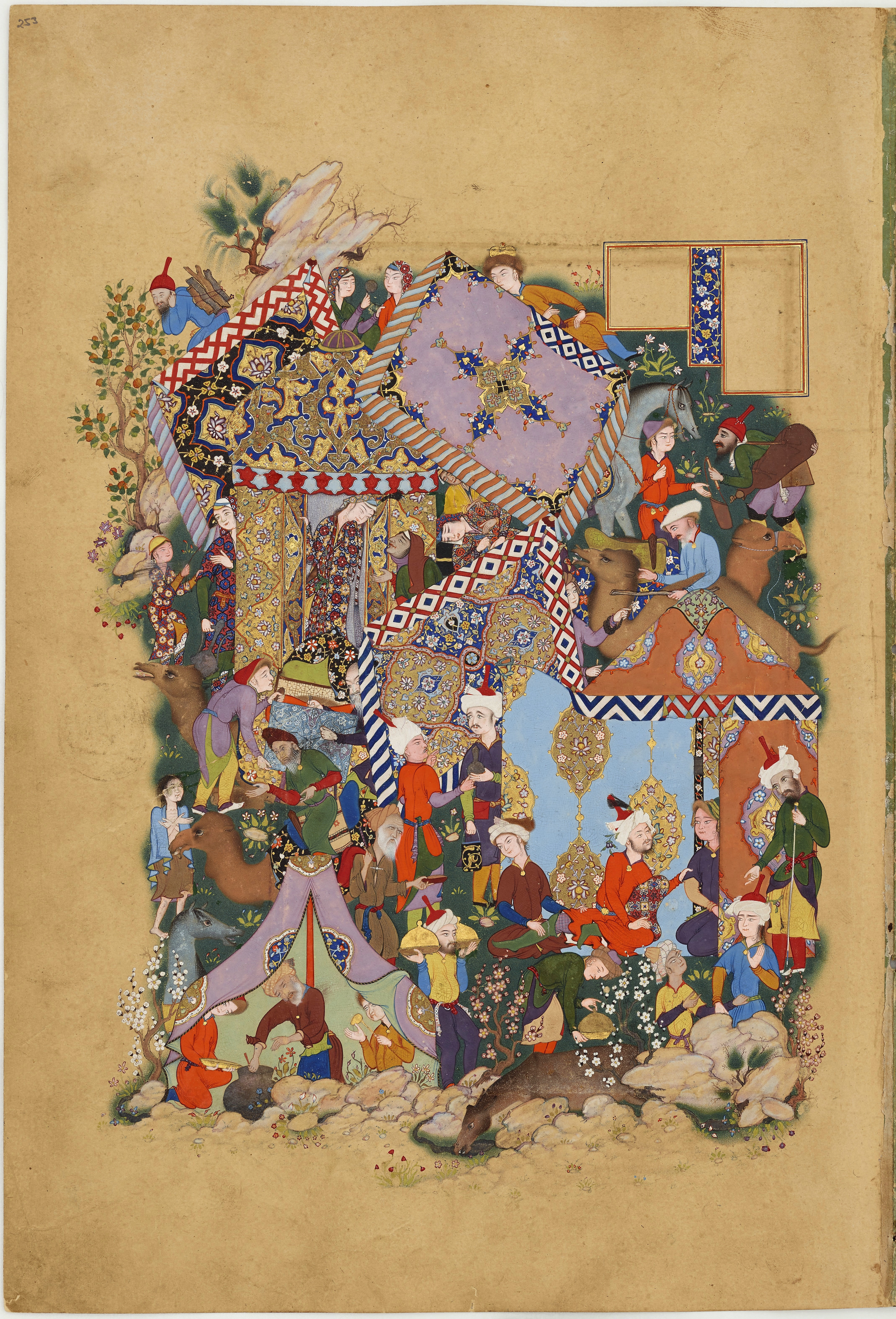
Majnun approaches the camp of Layli’s caravan by Shaykh Mohammad Sabzevari, Folio from the manuscript of Haft Awrang by Jami. Safavid period, 1556-1565

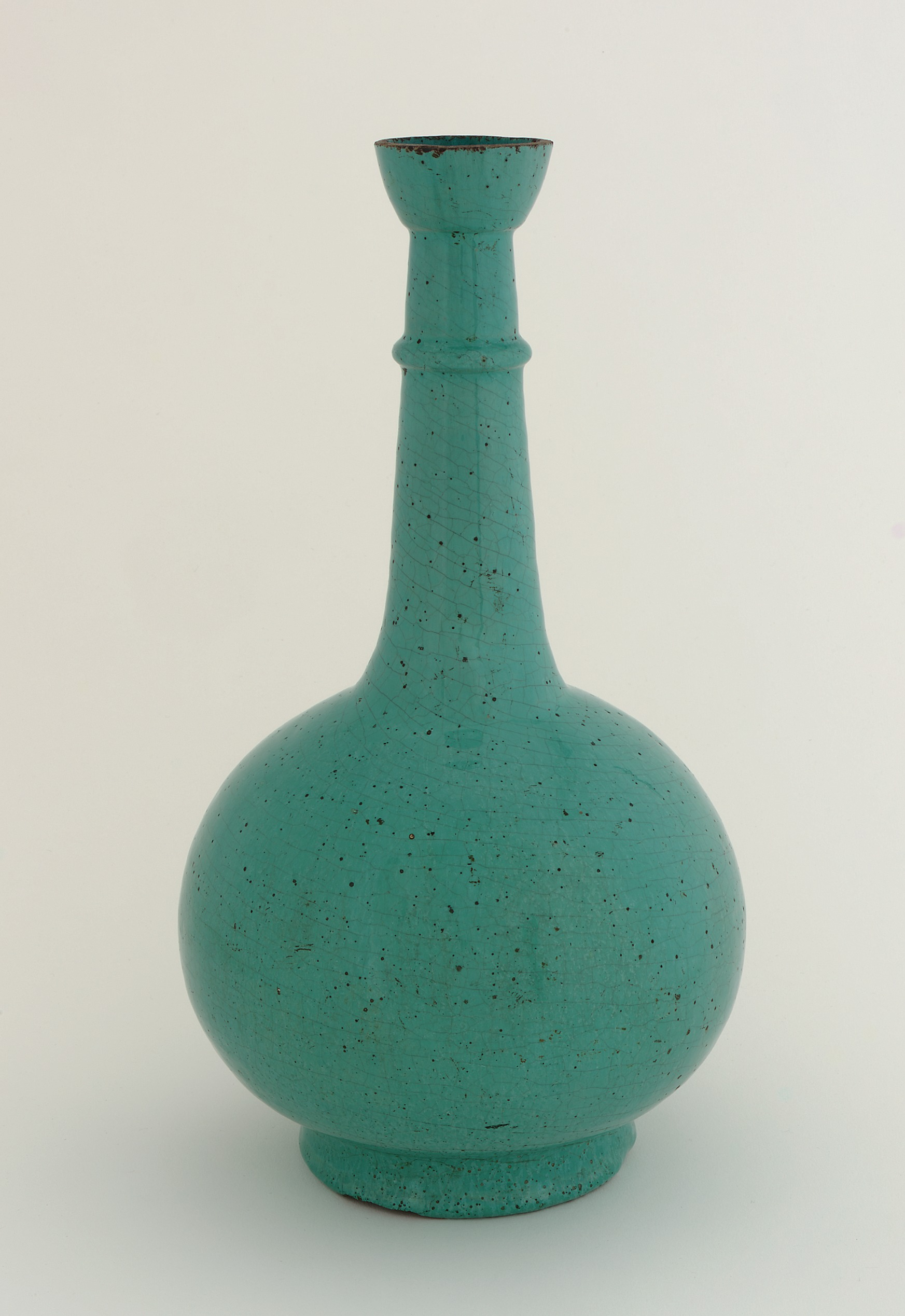
Monochrome ceramic bottle. Fritware painted under glaze. Safavid Iran, 17th century

=== Biblical Manuscripts ===
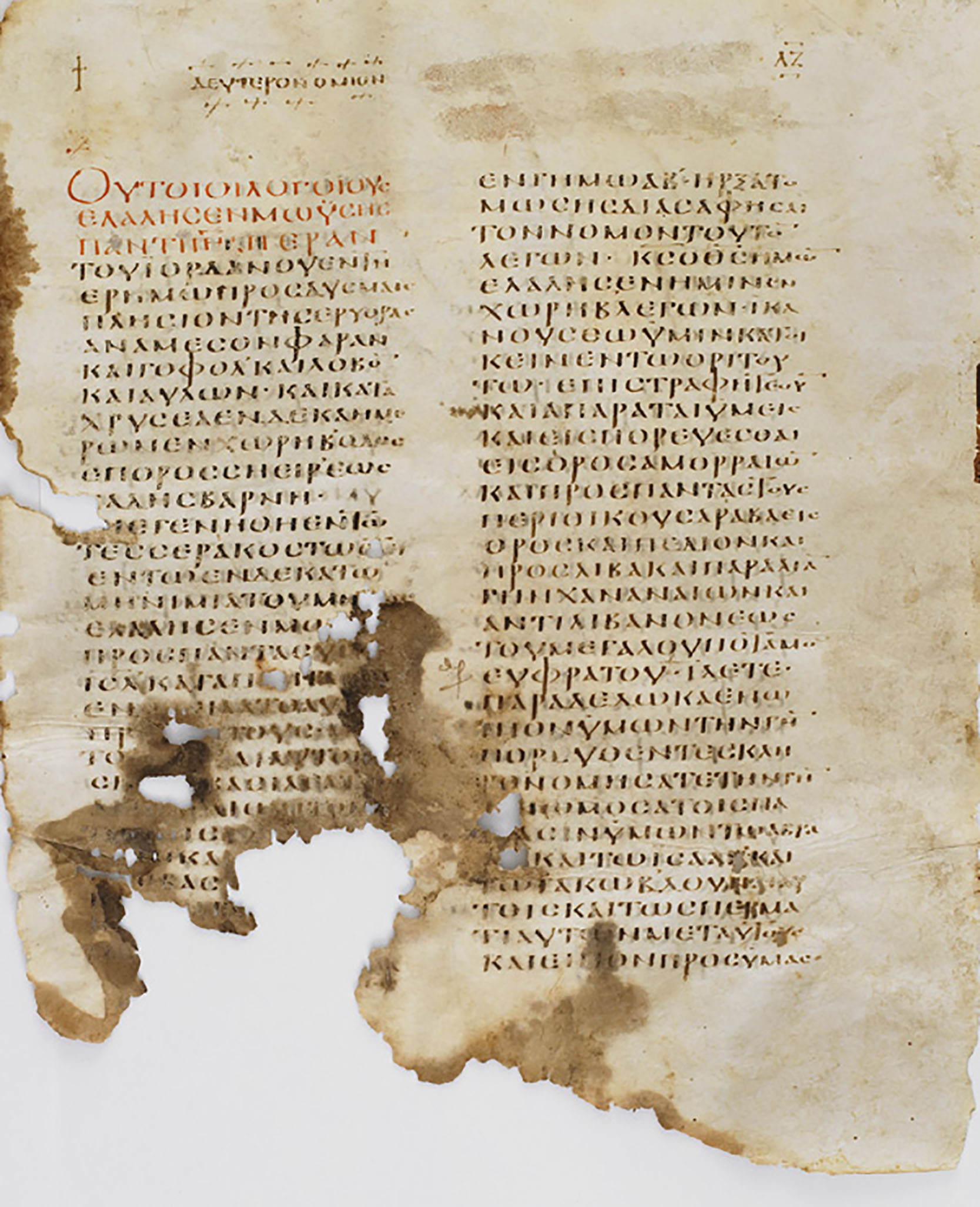
Washington manuscript I. Greek parchment codex, containing Deuteronomy and Joshua. Early 5th century

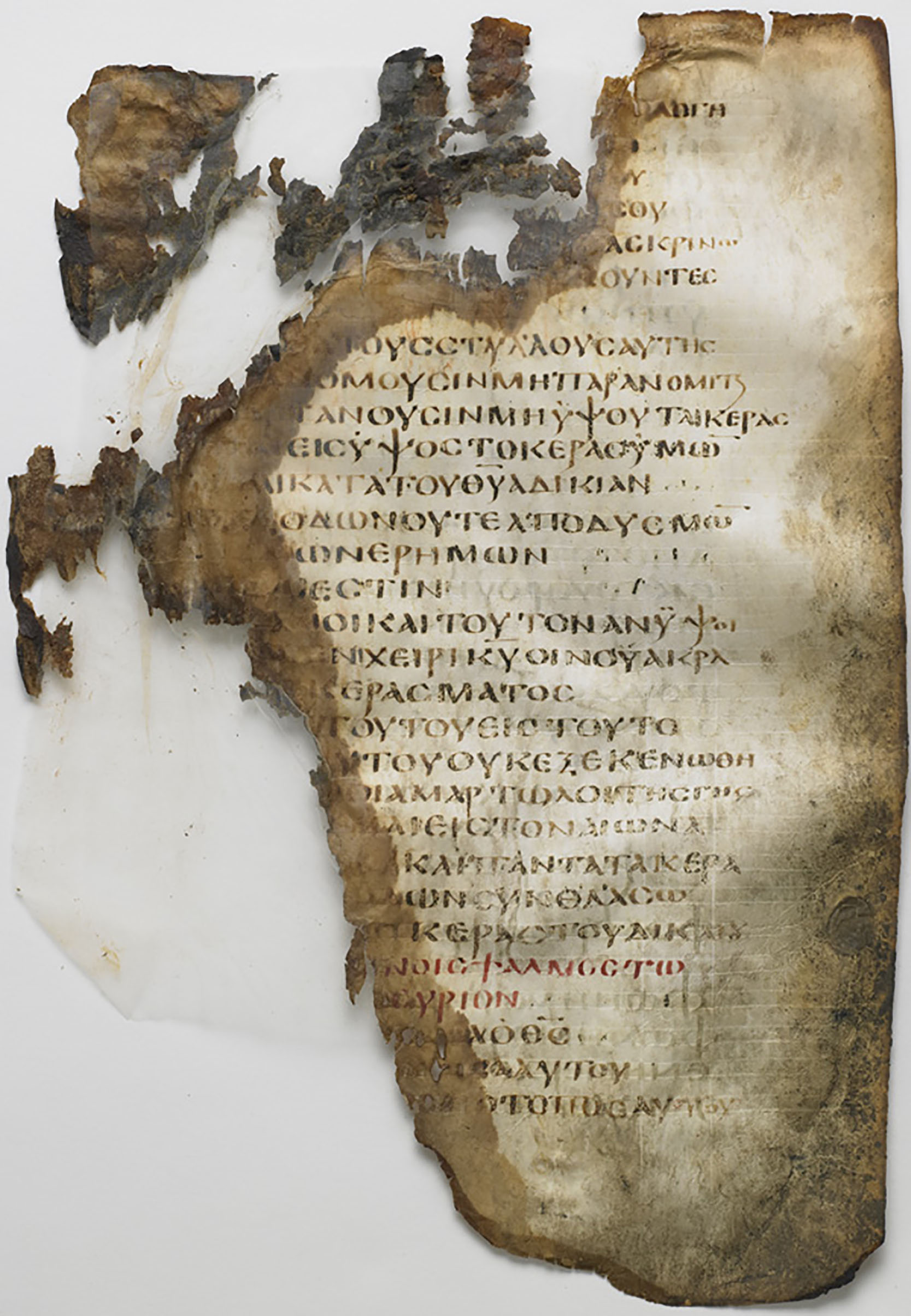
Washington Manuscript II (Rahlfs 1219). Greek parchment codex of the Psalms. 5th century CE

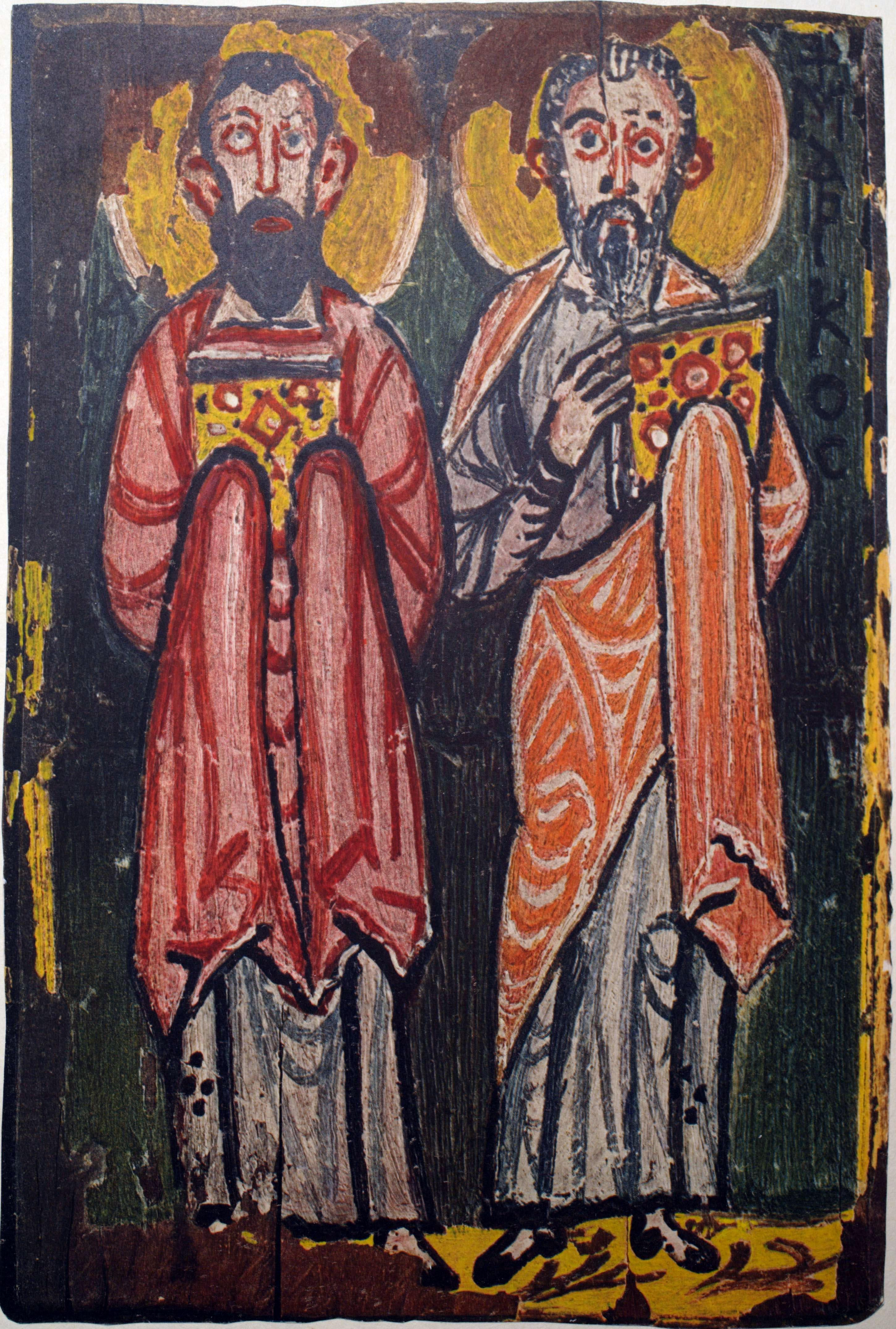
Codex Washingtonianus. Greek parchment codex with Gospels. 4th or 5th century

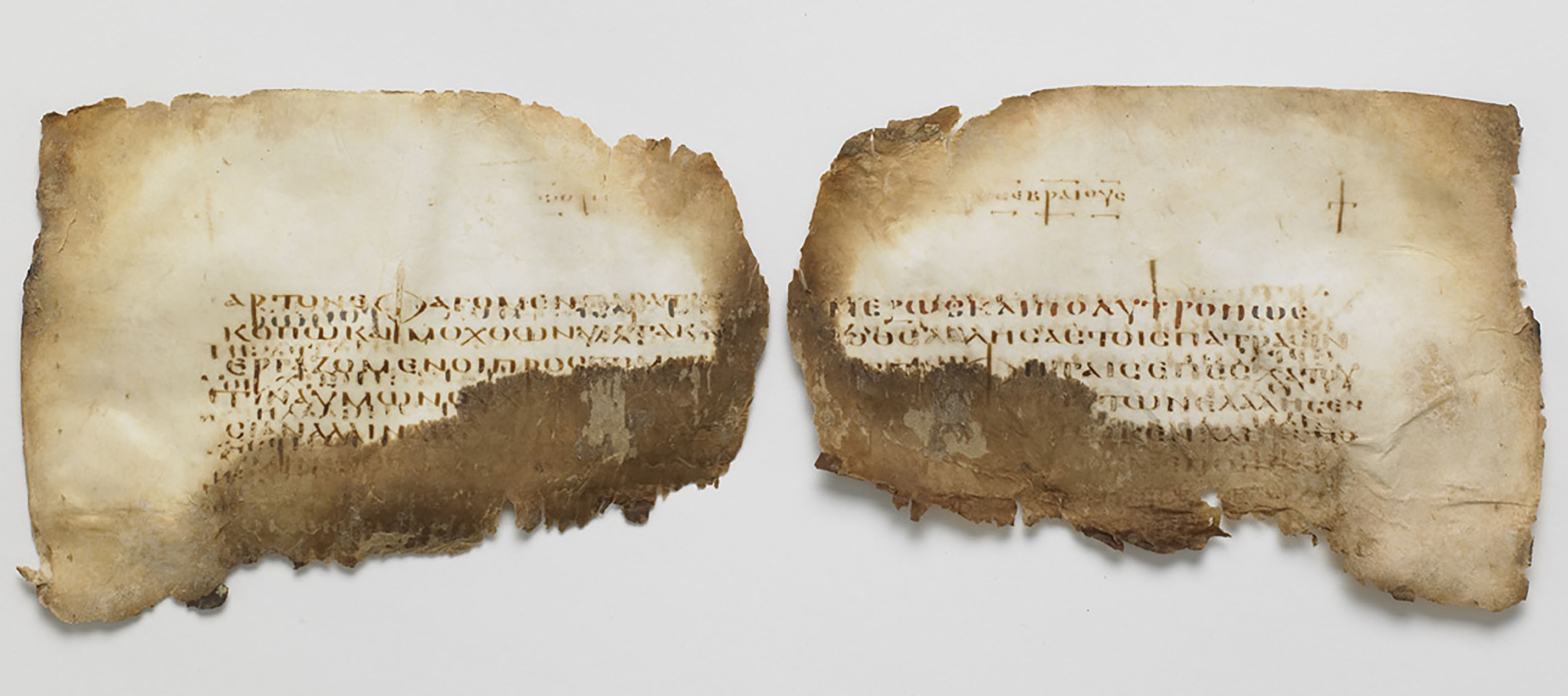
Washington Manuscript IV (Codex Freerianus). Greek vellum codex. 5th century CE

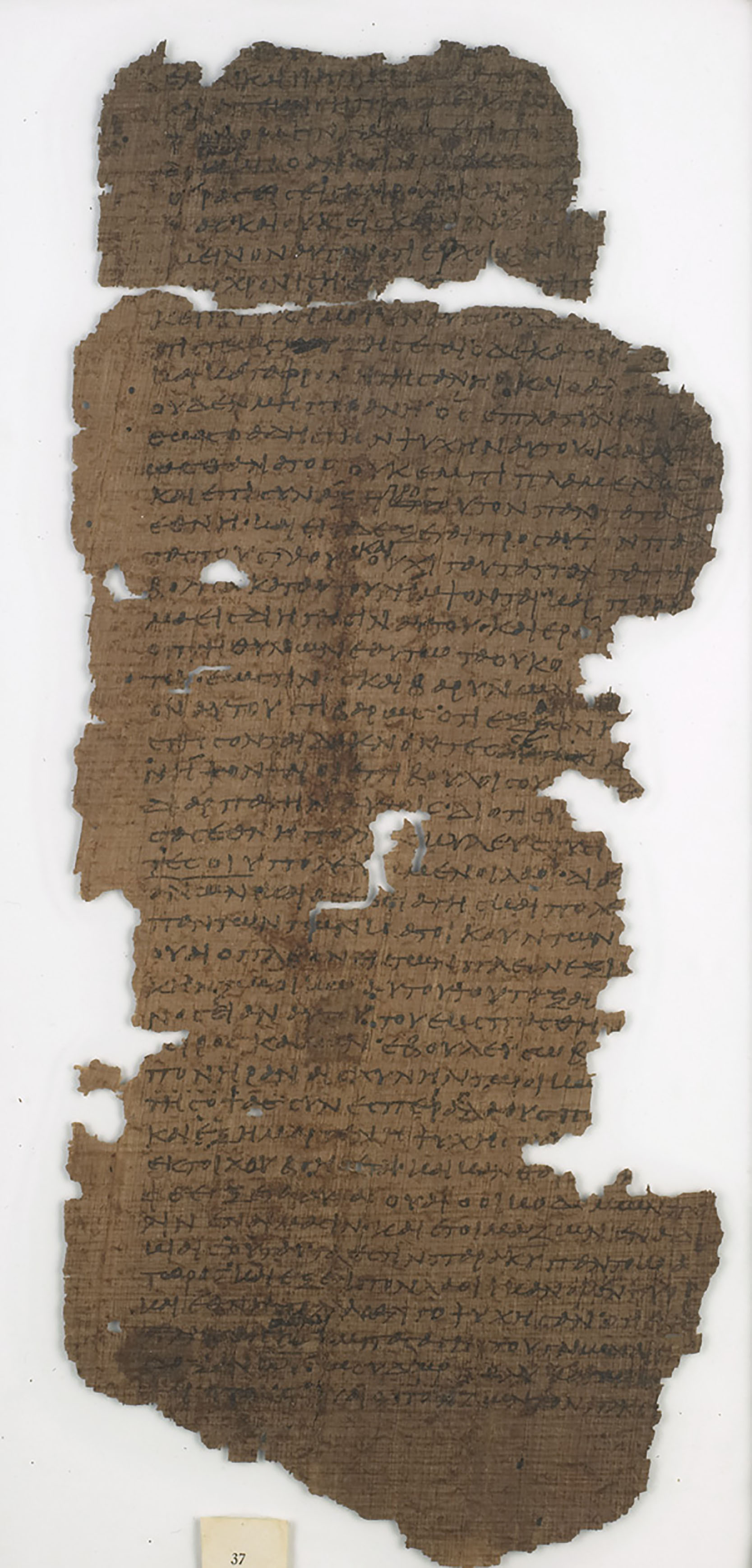
Washington Manuscript V. Greek on papyri, Twelve Minor Prophets. 3rd century CE

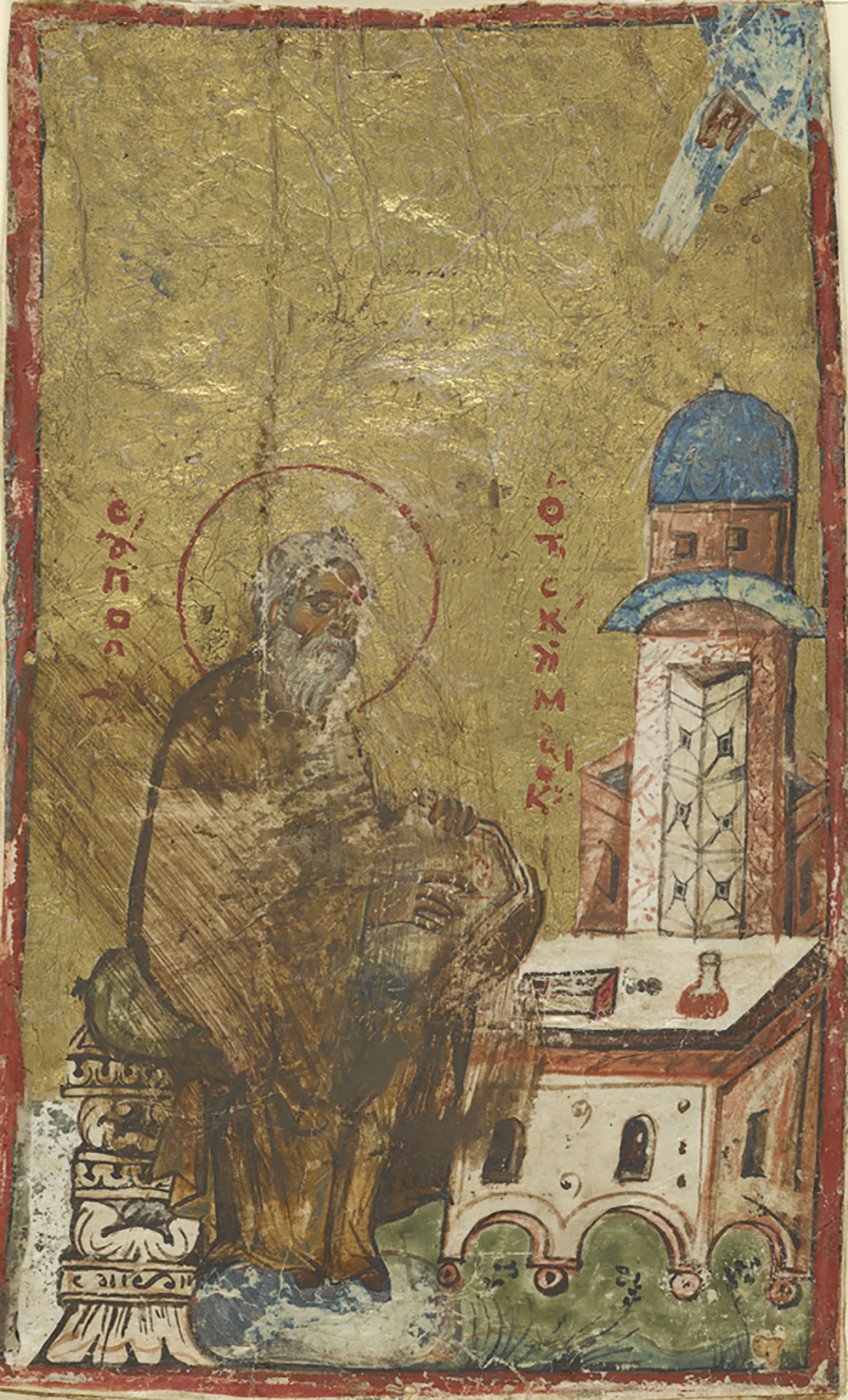
St. John of the Ladder (Climacus): illustration from a Klimax manuscript. Byzantine period, early 12th century

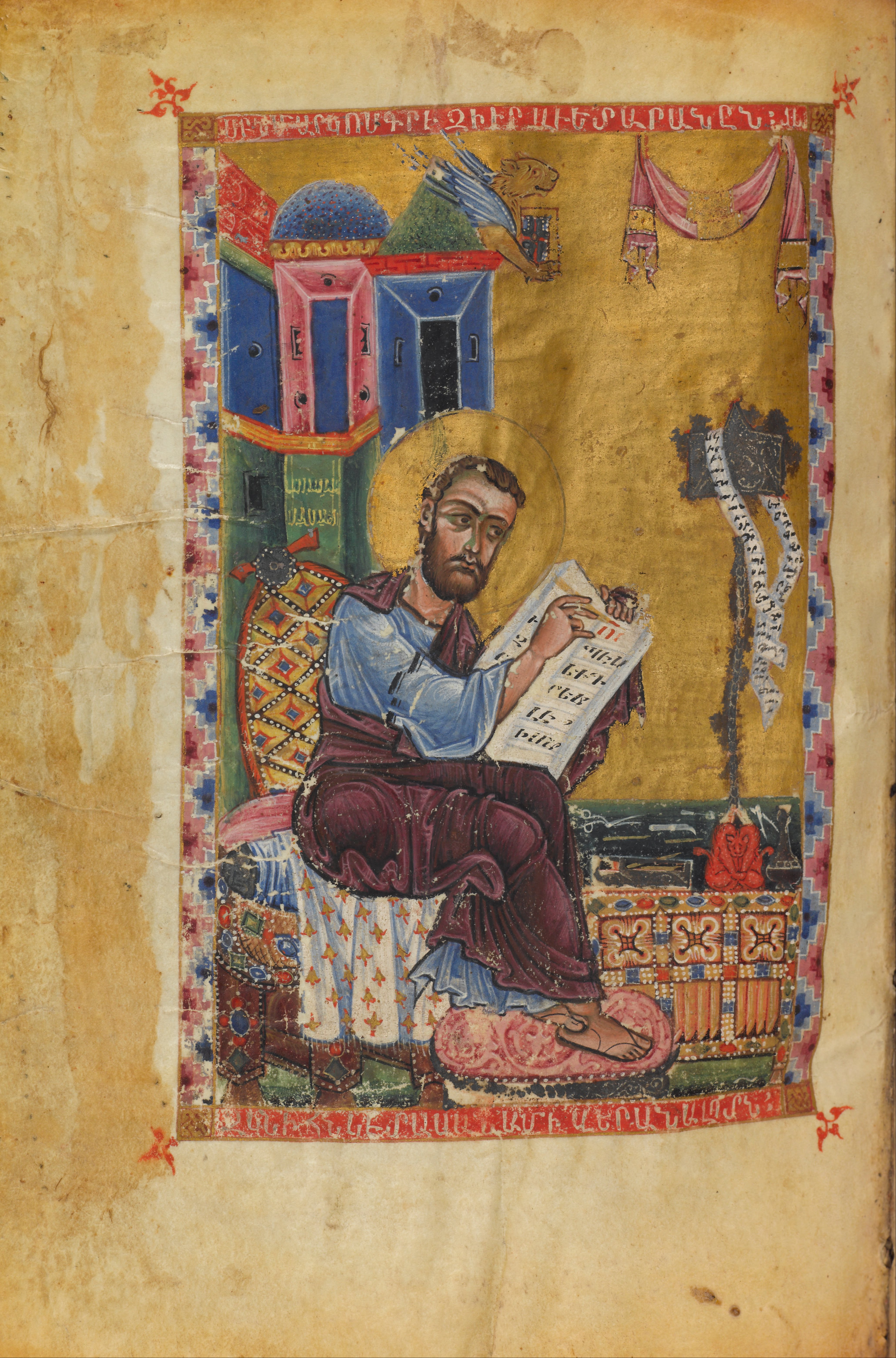
Portrait of Saint Mark in Armenian Gospel manuscript. Yohanes, Armenia, 1253

=== Chinese Art ===
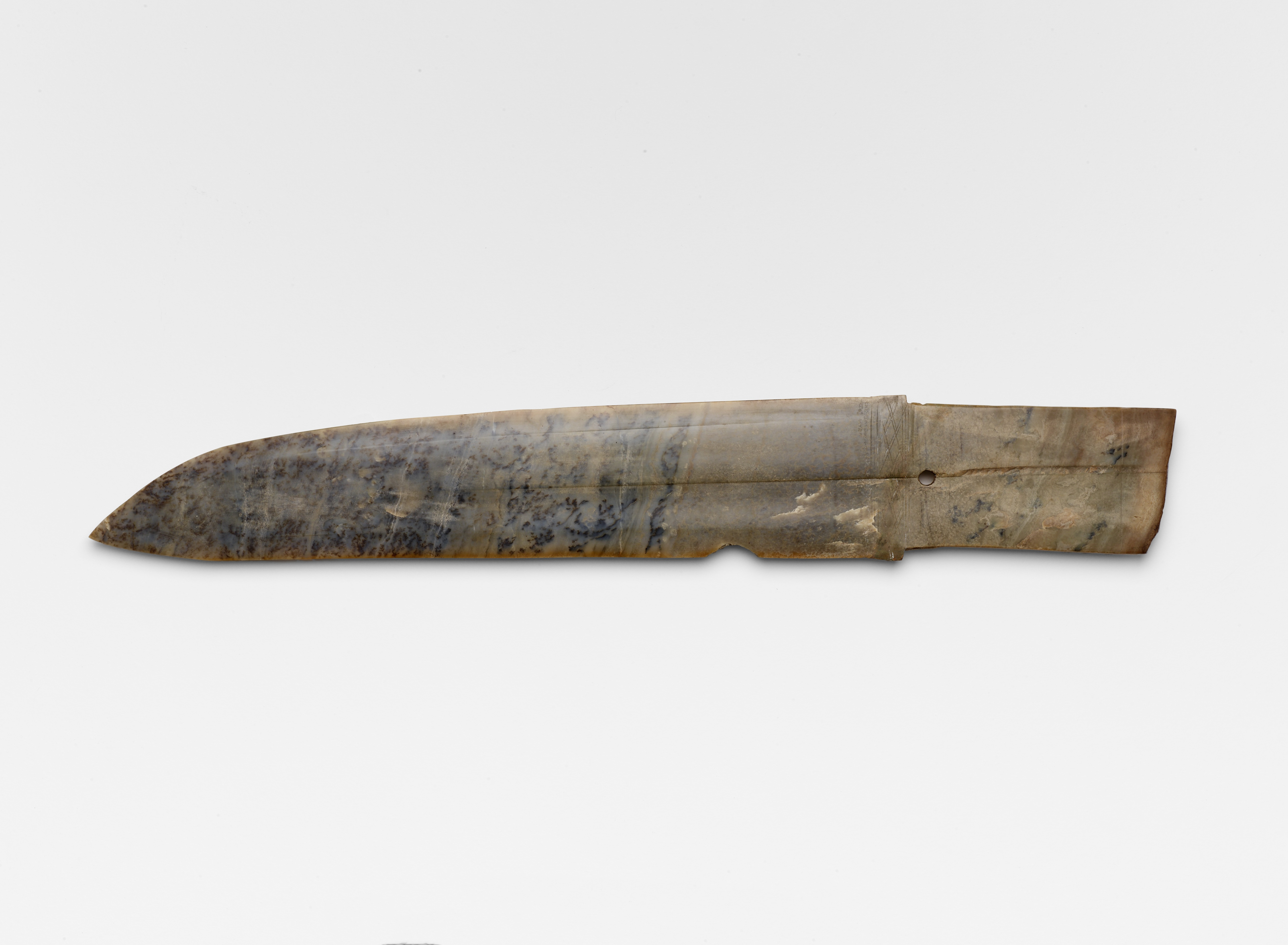
Dagger-axe with inscription of thirty characters. Jade (nephrite). Erlitou culture or early Shang dynasty, c. 2000 - c. 1400 p.n.e.

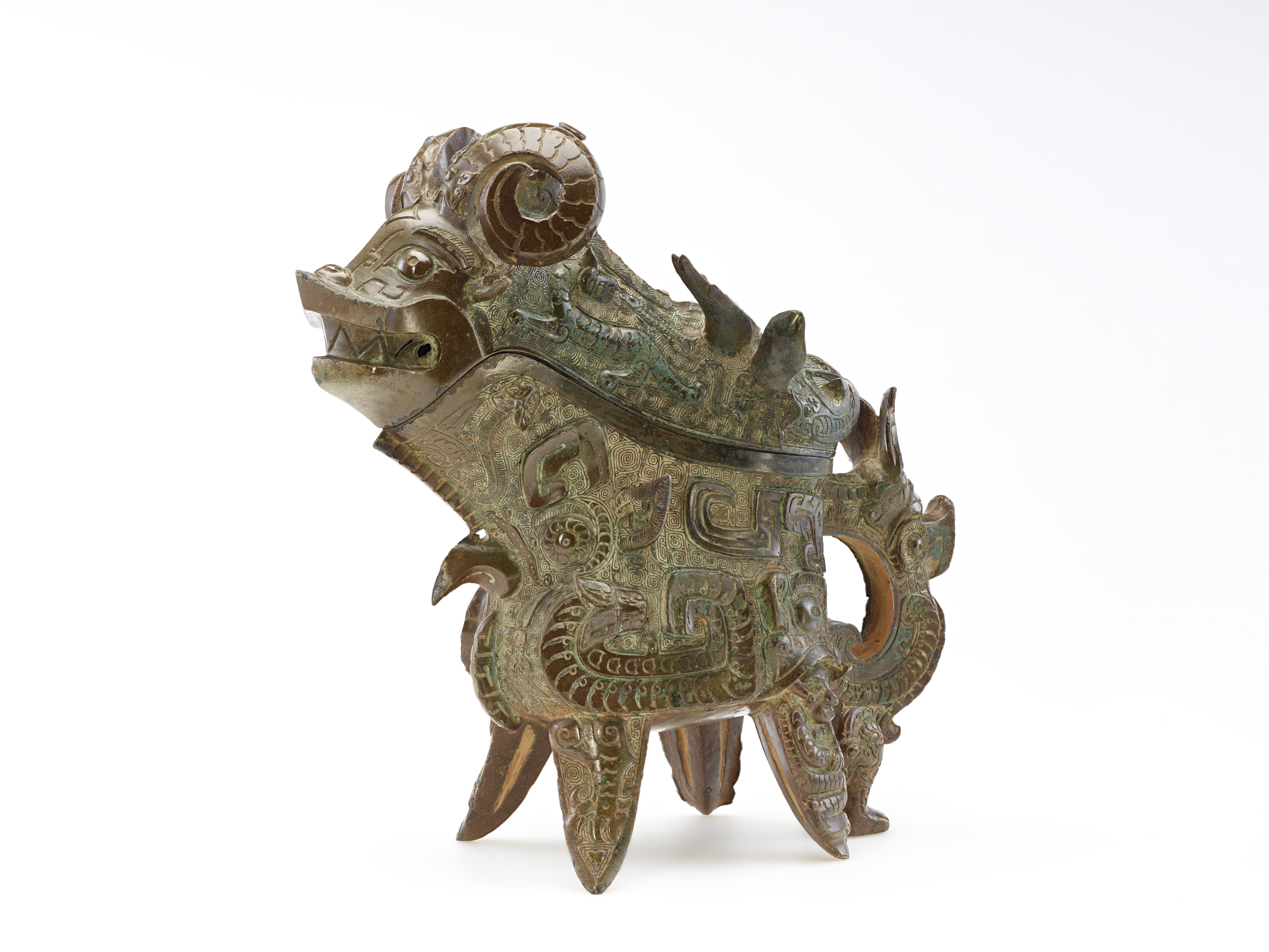
Ritual wine ewer (guang) with taotie, dragons, and real animals. Late Shang dynasty, 11th century BCE

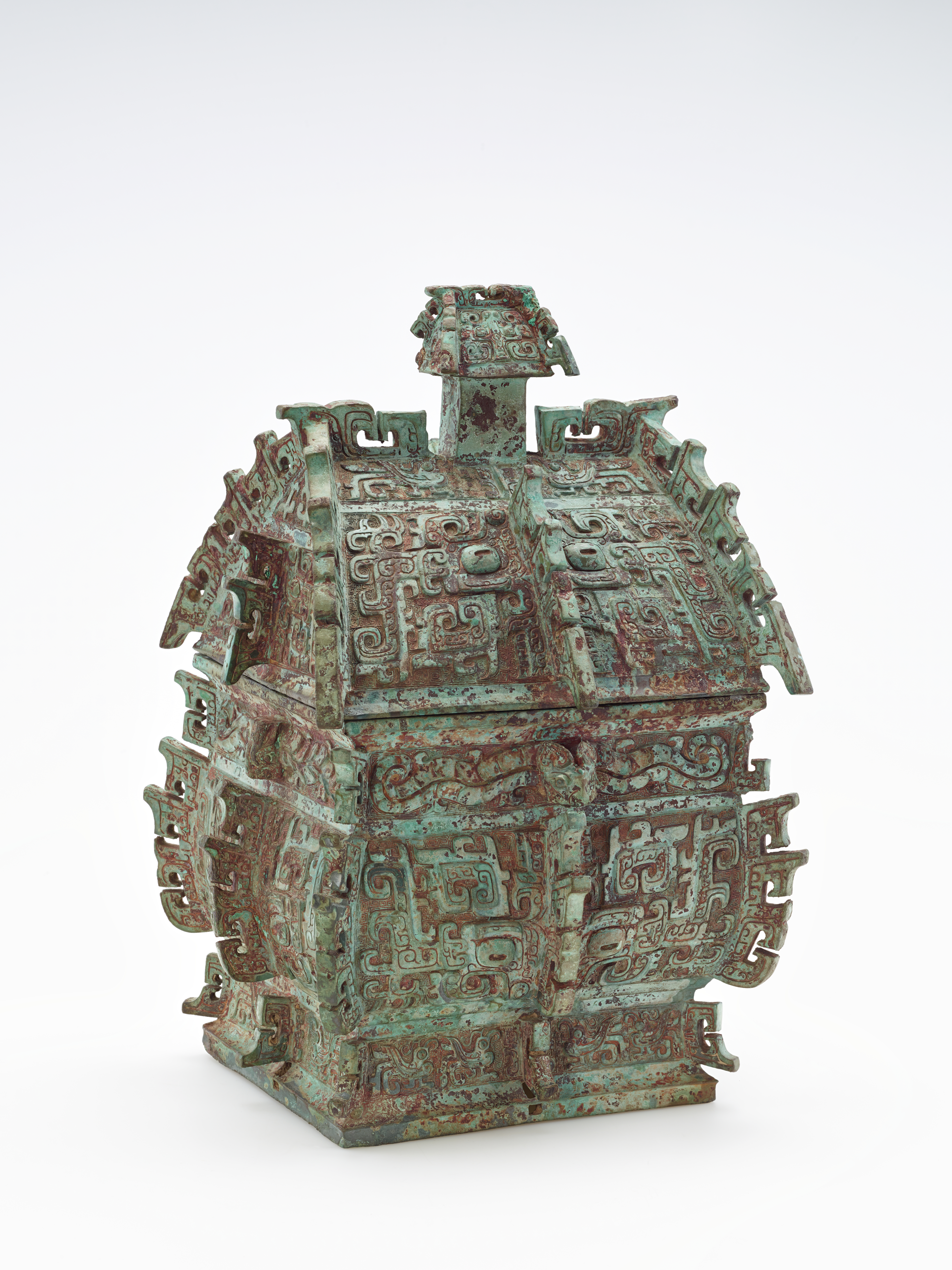
Fangyi with cast inscription of 187 characters which commemorates three days of meetings and ceremonies held in Chengzhou during the reign of King Zhao (977/75–957 BC)

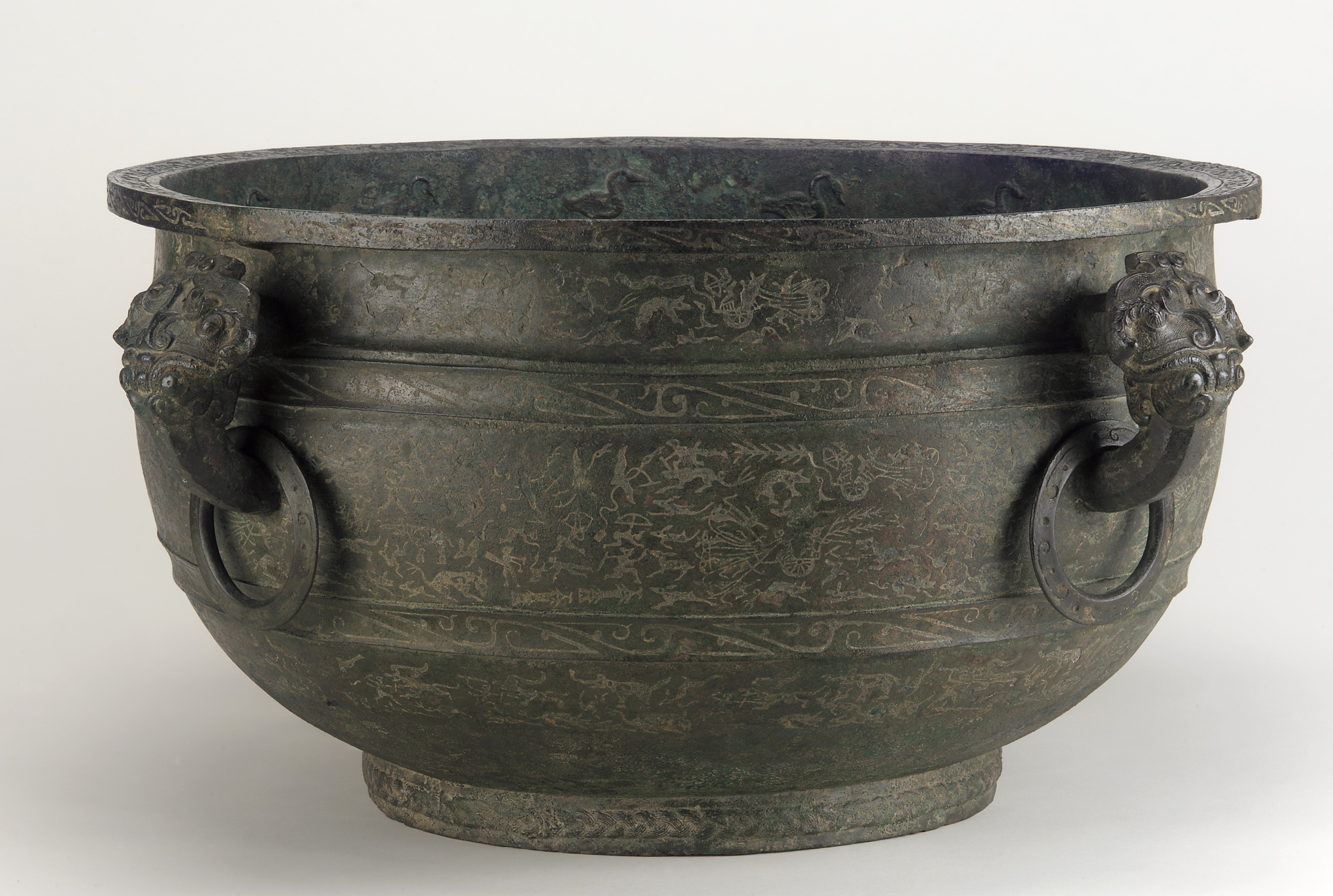
Basin (jian) with narrative scenes. Bronze. Eastern Zhou, 5th century BCE

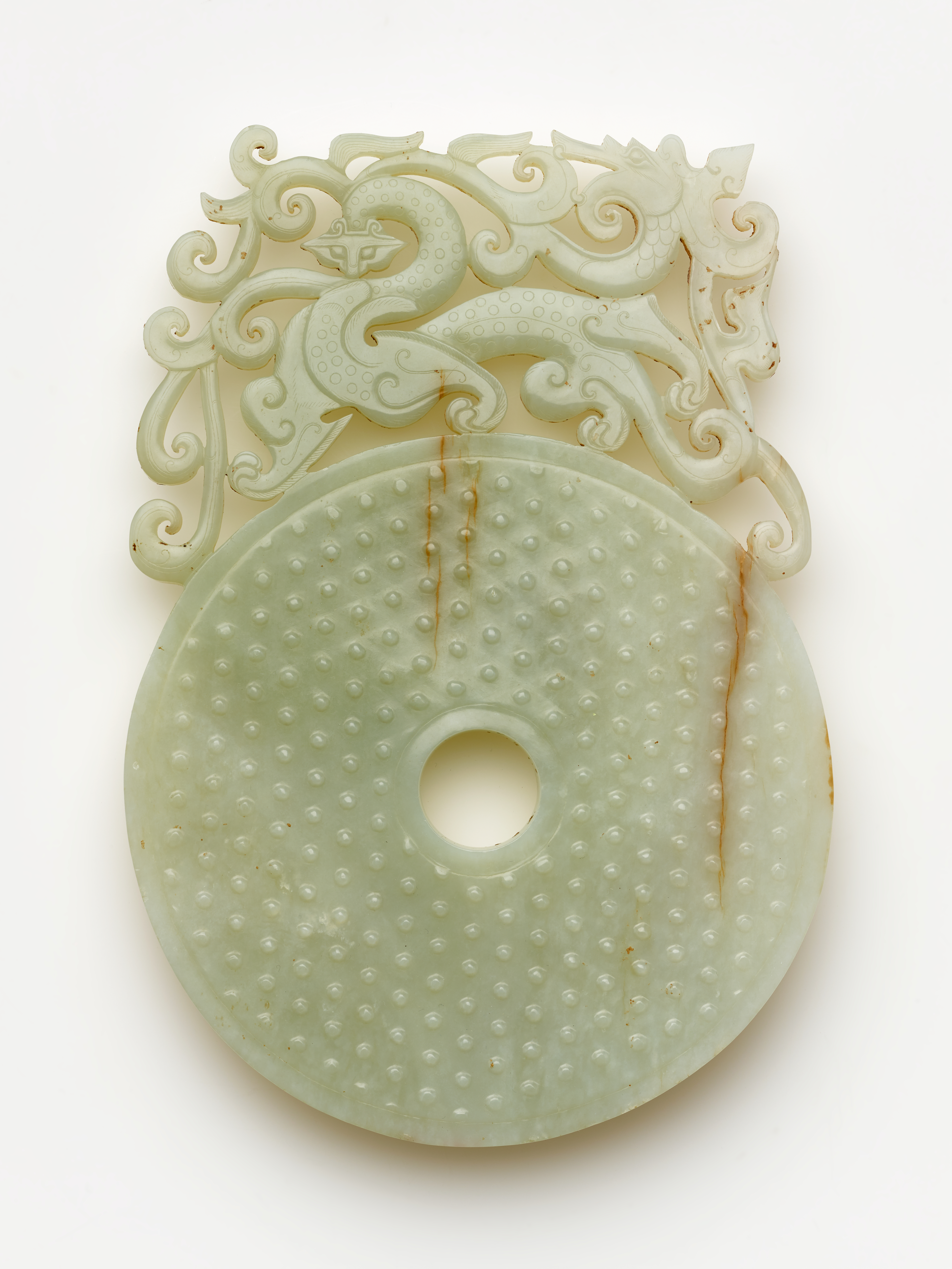
Disk (bi) with knobs, feline and dragon. Nephrite. Han dynasty, between 100 and 220 CE

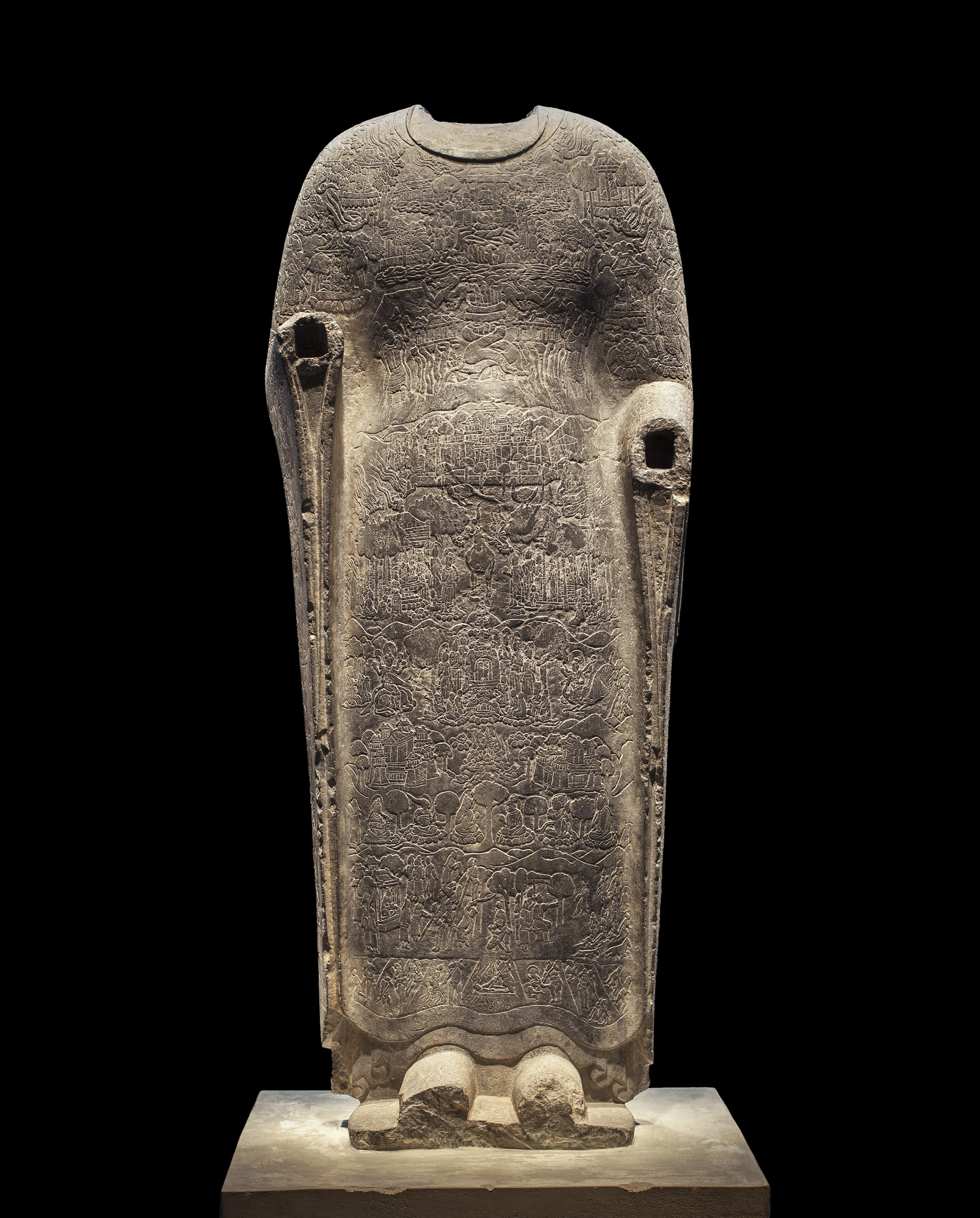
Buddha Vairocana draped in robes portraying the Realms of Existence. Limestone, Northern Qi, between 550 and 577

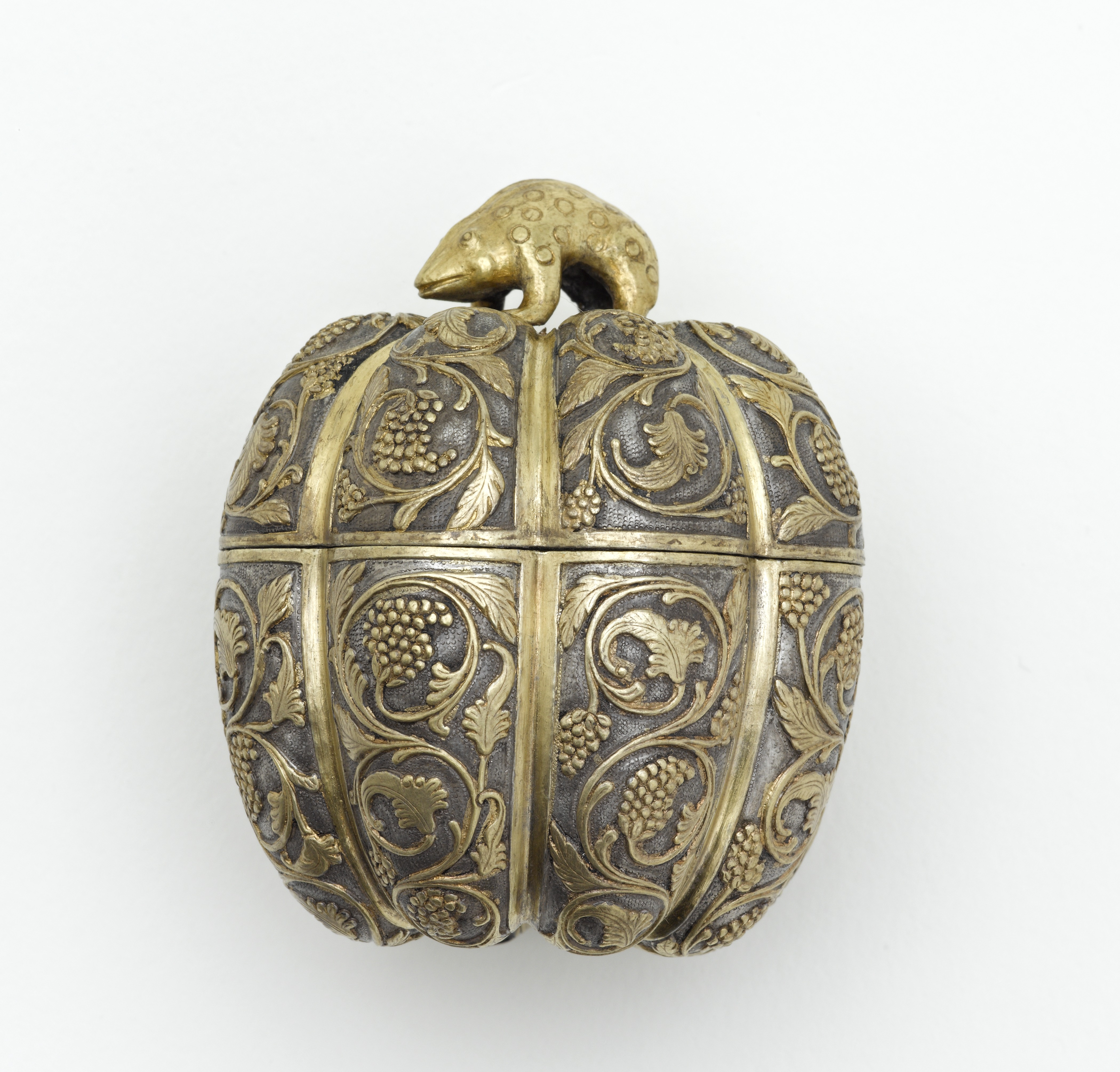
Lidded box in the form of a melon with grapevines and knob in the shape of a rodent. Cast and hammered silver with chased and ring-punched decoration and leaf gilding. Tang dynasty, late 7th-early 8th century

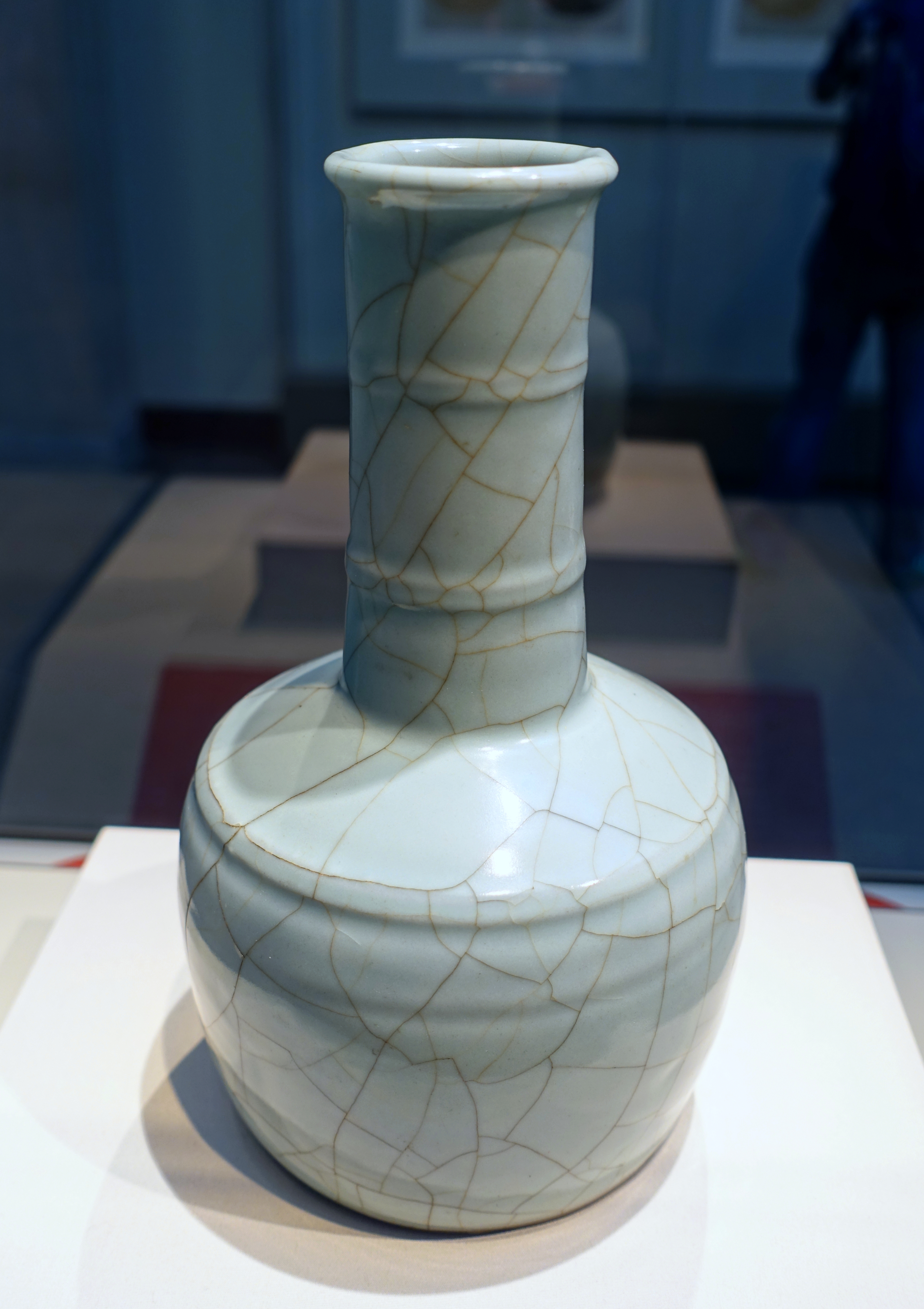
Guan ware vase. Song dynasty, 12th century

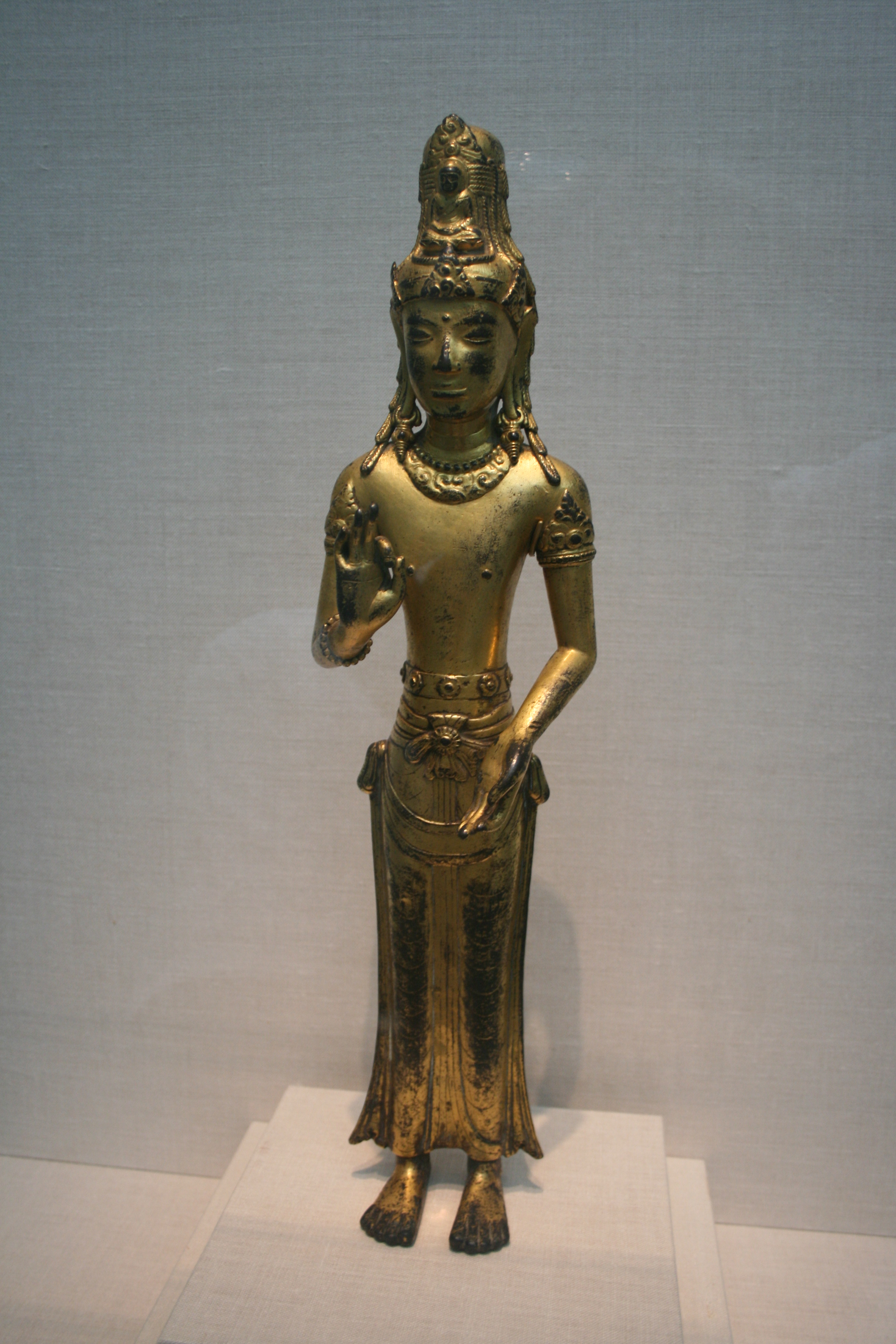
Bodhisattva Guanyin. Gilded domeykite. Dali Kingdom, 12th century

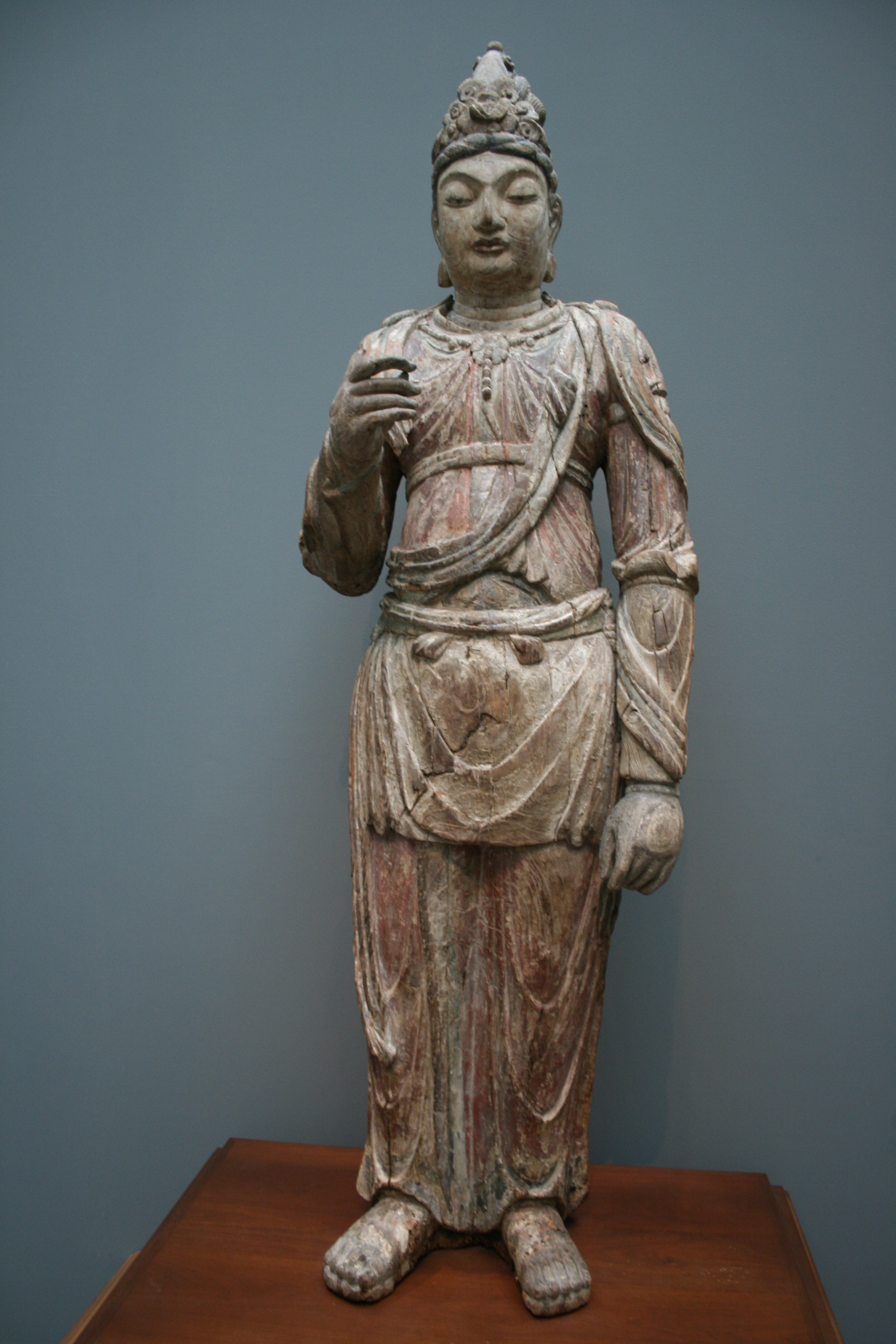
Standing Bodhisattva. Wood, Jin dynasty

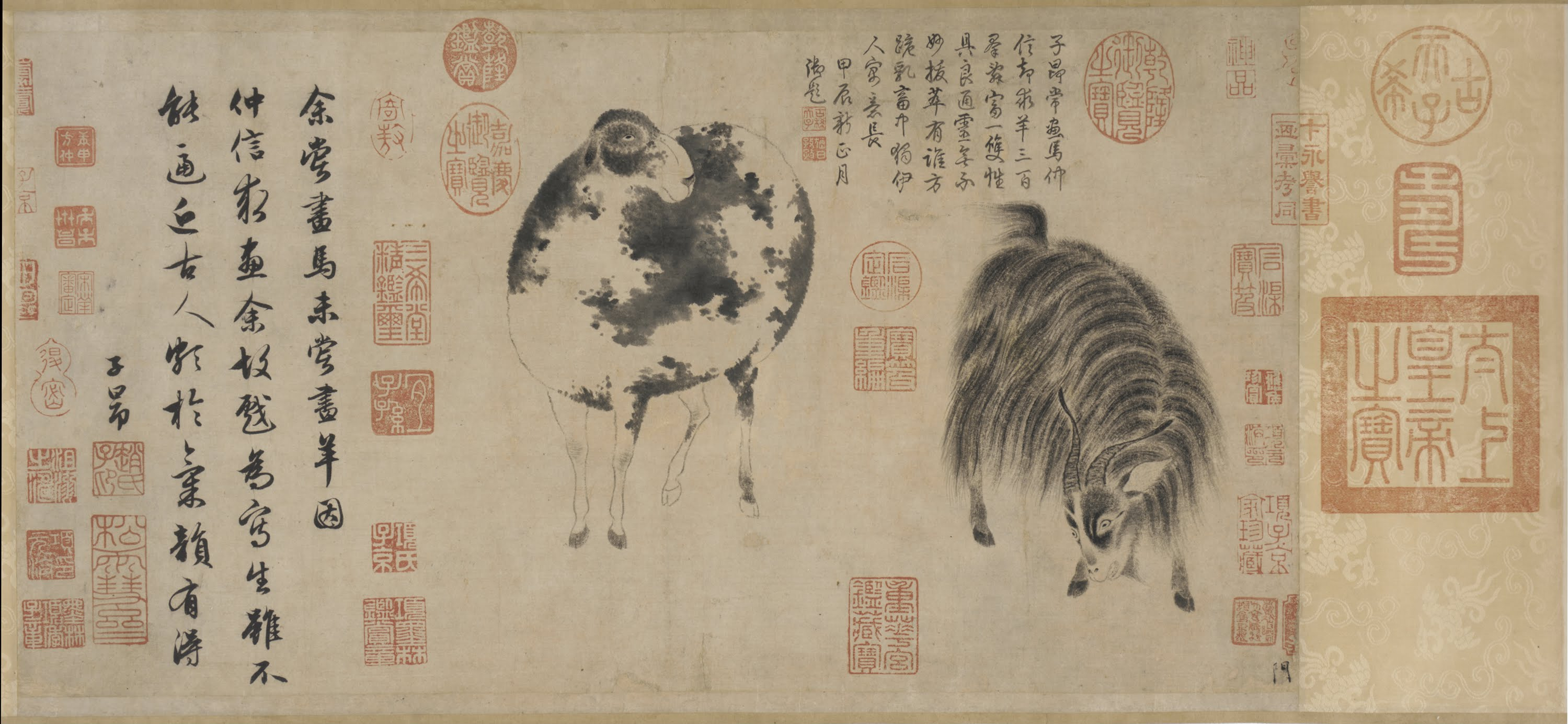
Sheep and goat by Zhao Mengfu. Handscroll. Yuan dynasty, c. 1300

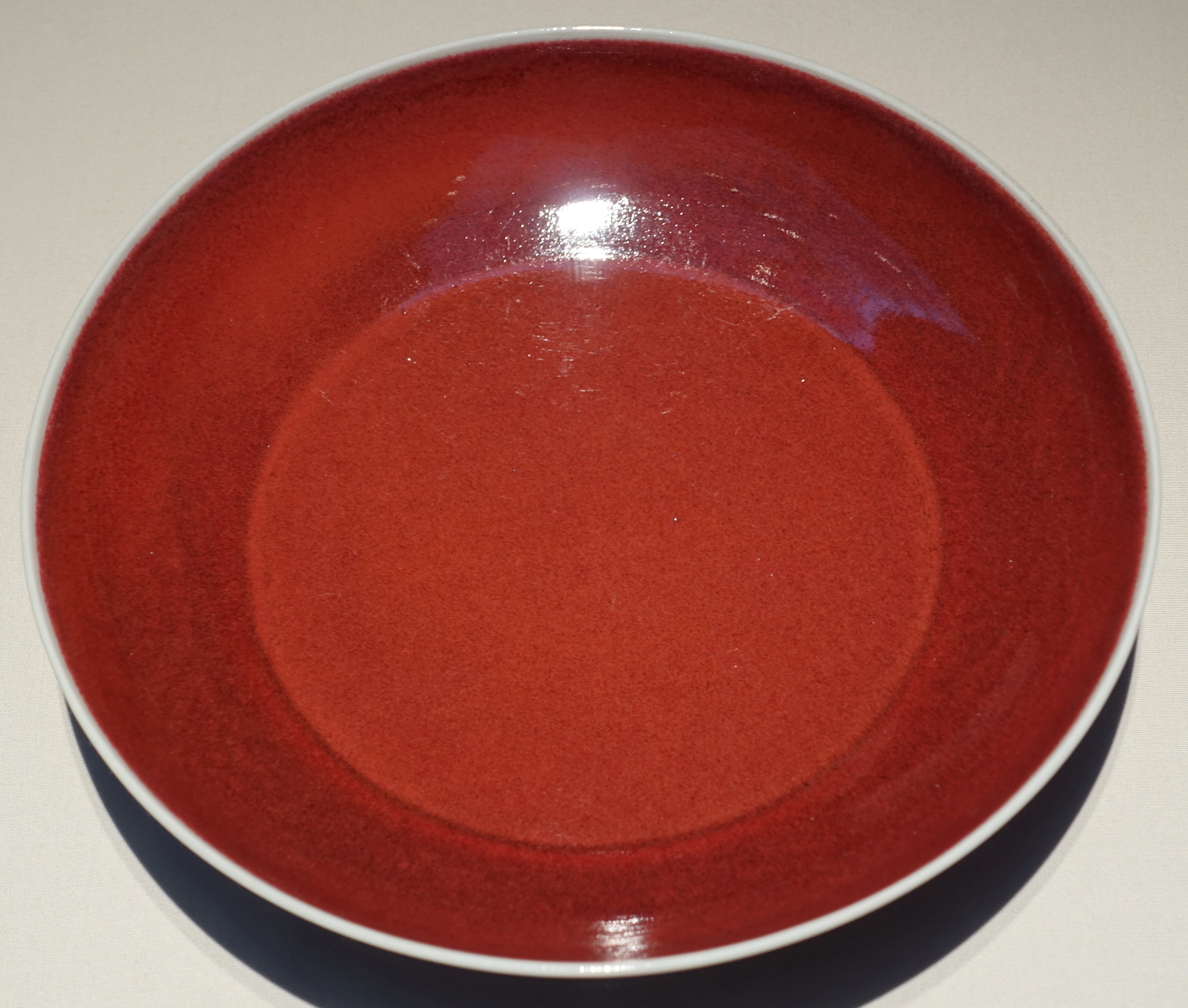
Dish with copper-red glaze, and a Xuande mark in cobalt oxide on the base. Ming dynasty, 1426-1435

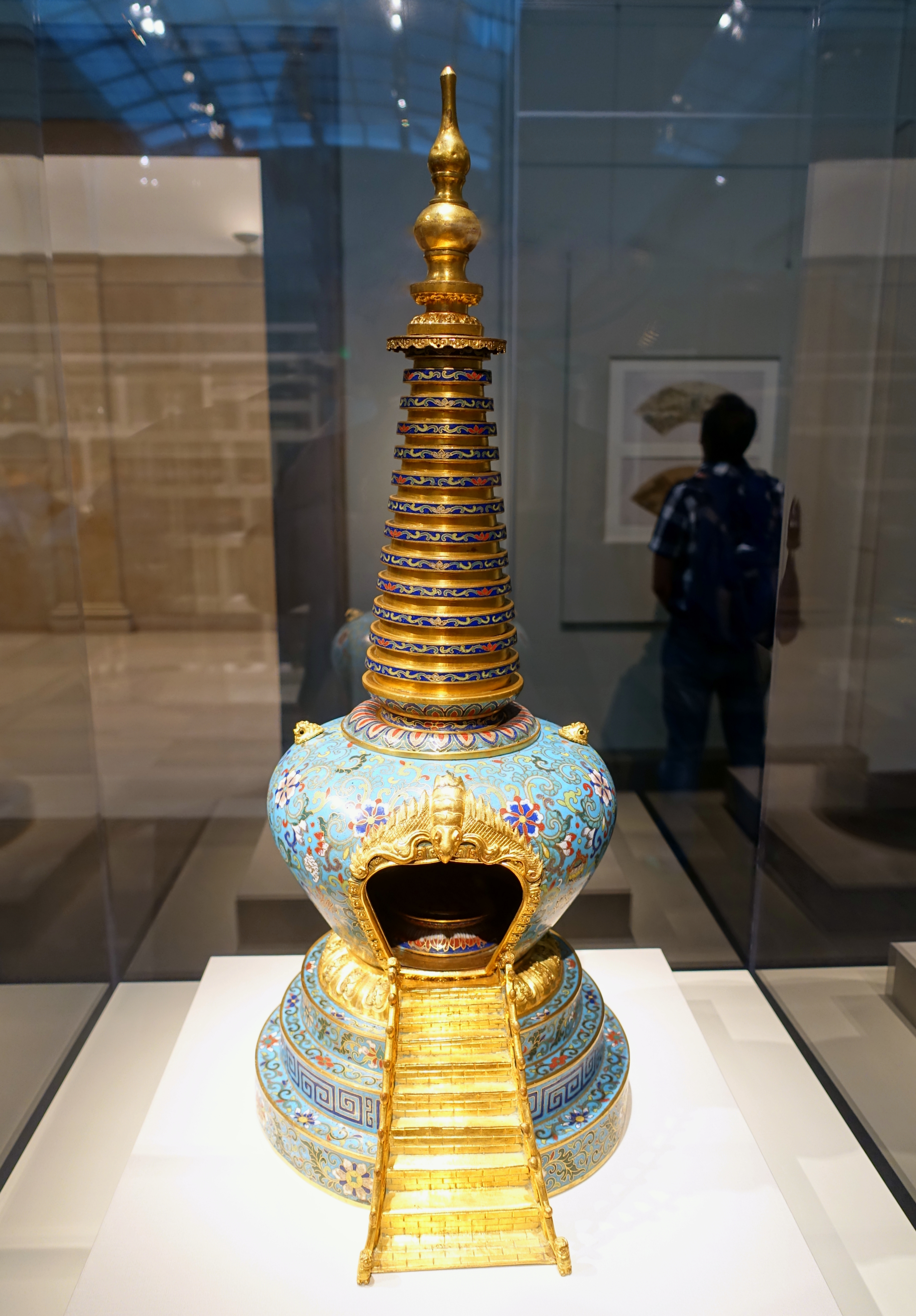
Cloisonne stupa with gilt ornaments. Qing dynasty, mid- to late 18th century

=== Japanese Art ===
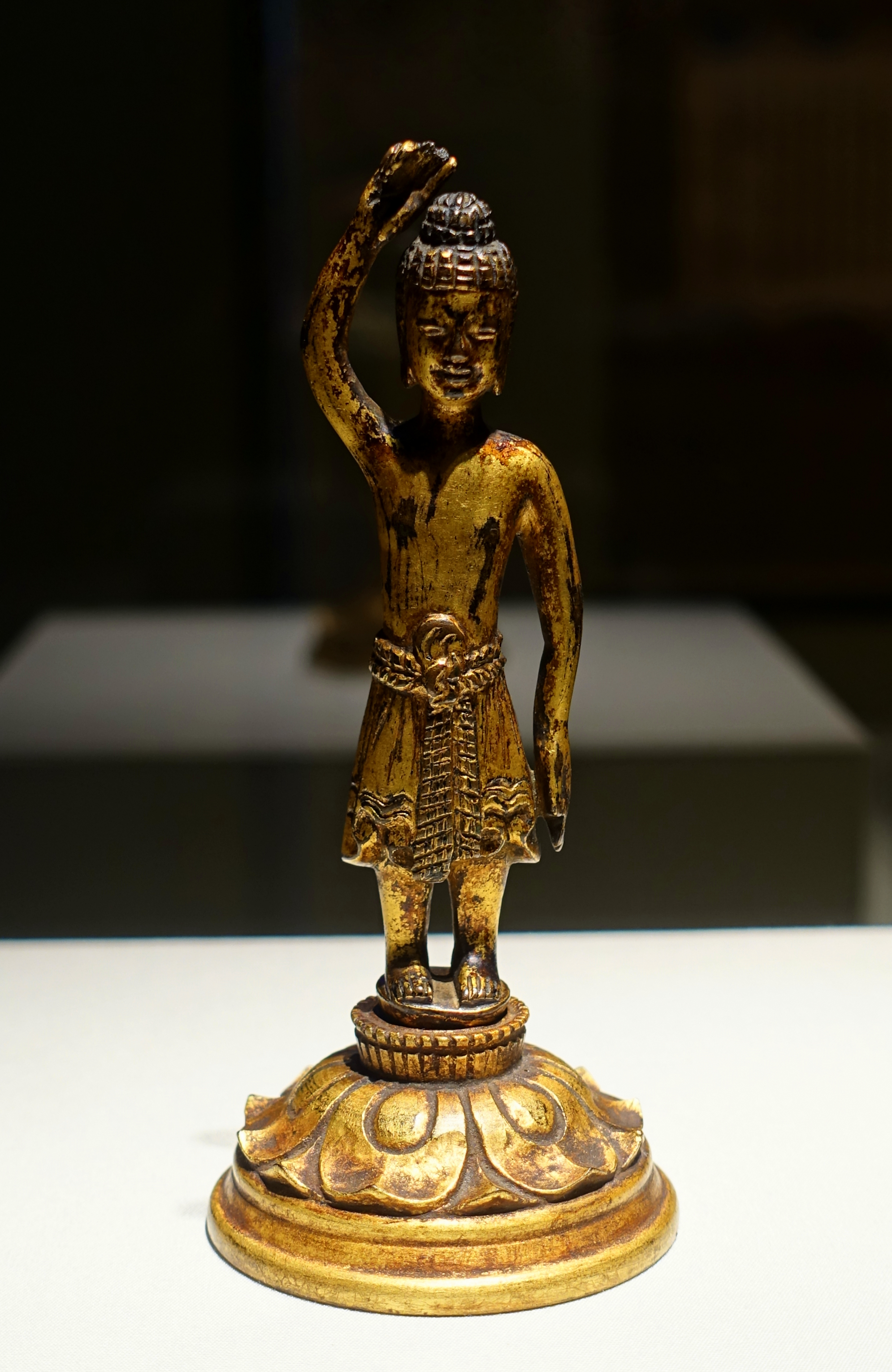
The Buddha at Birth. Gilt bronze. Asuka period, 7th century

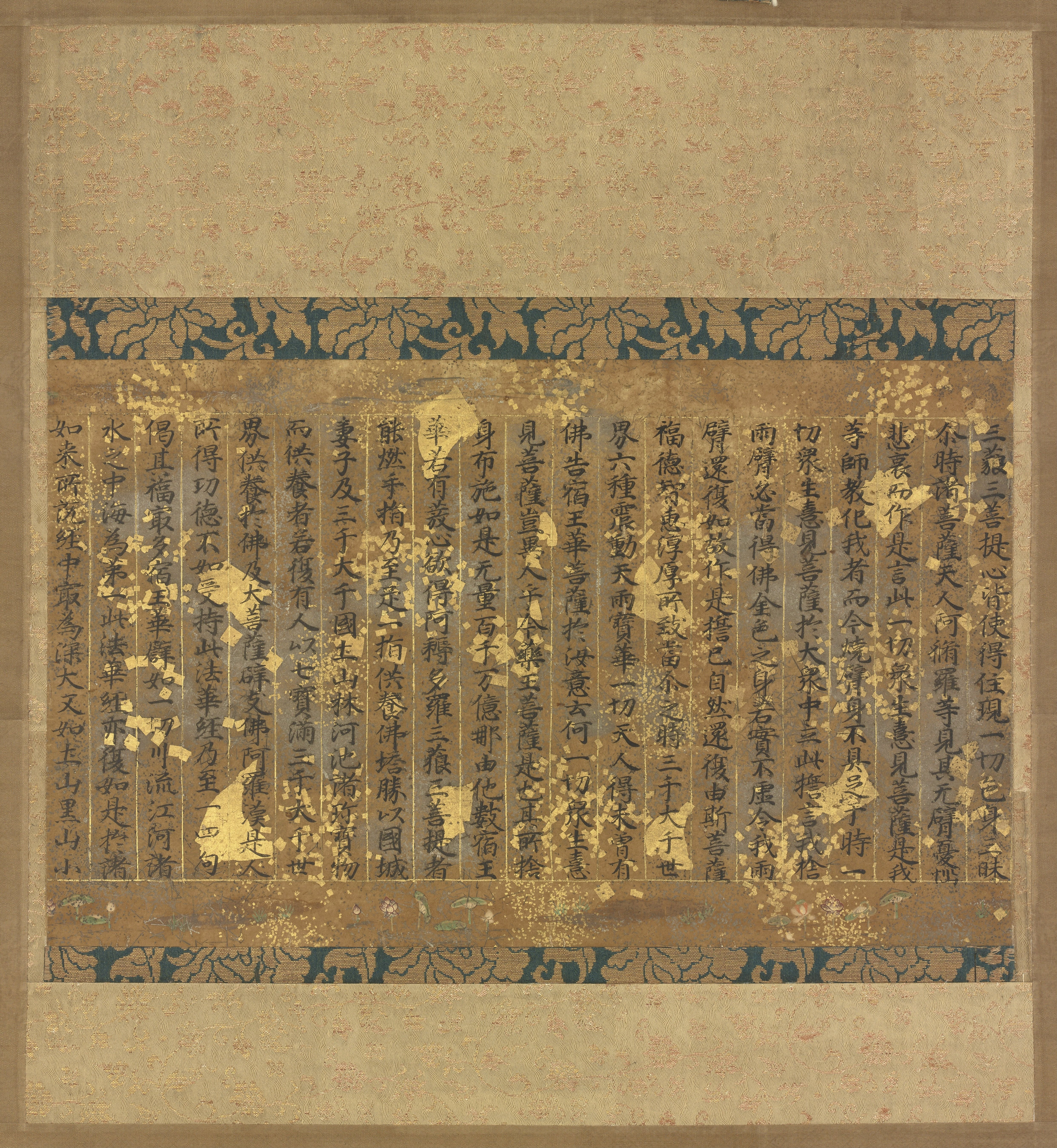
Lotus Sutra. Ink, gold, silver, and color on paper. Late Heian period, mid 12th century

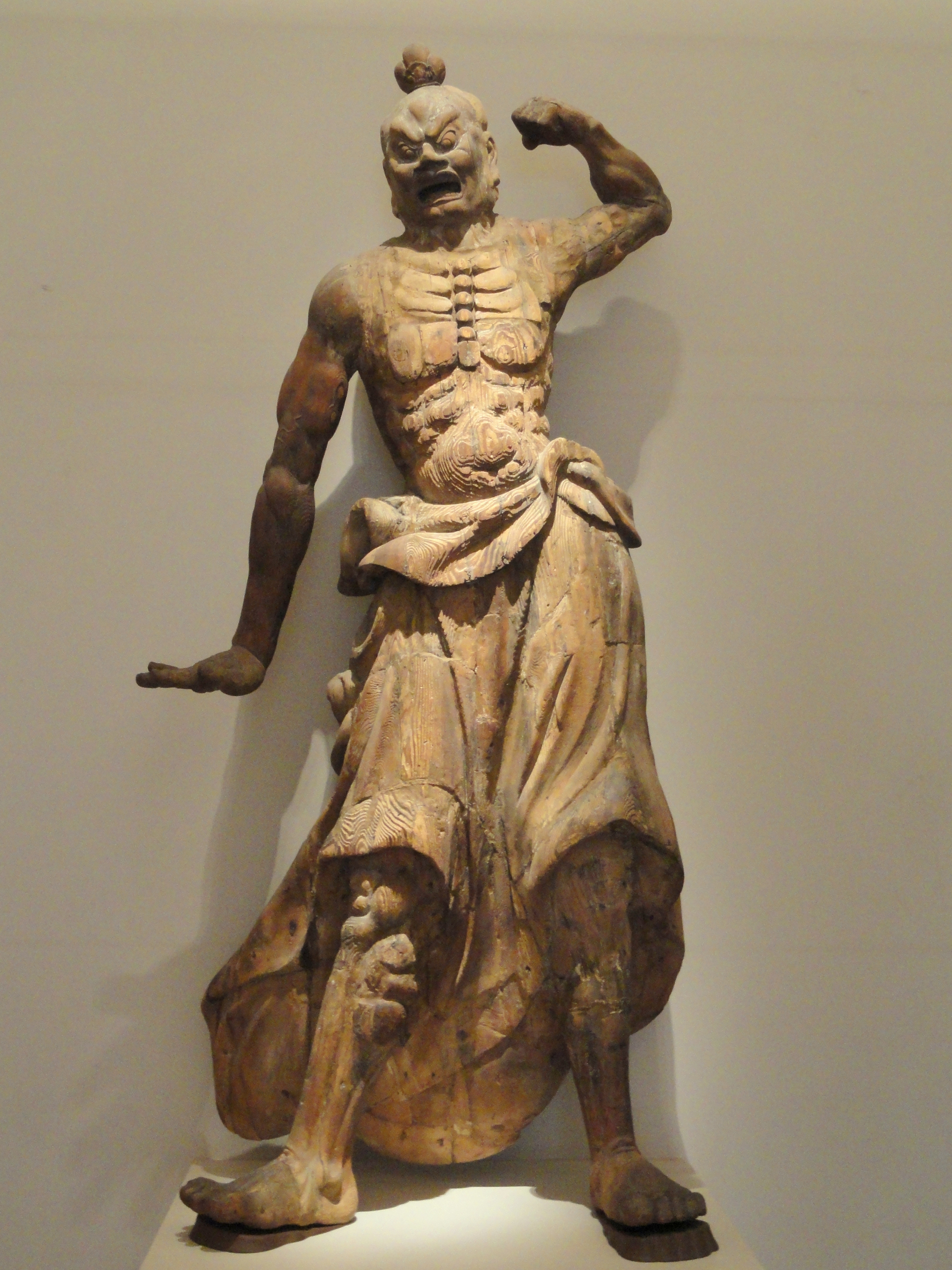
Guardian figure. Wood. Kamakura period, early 14th century

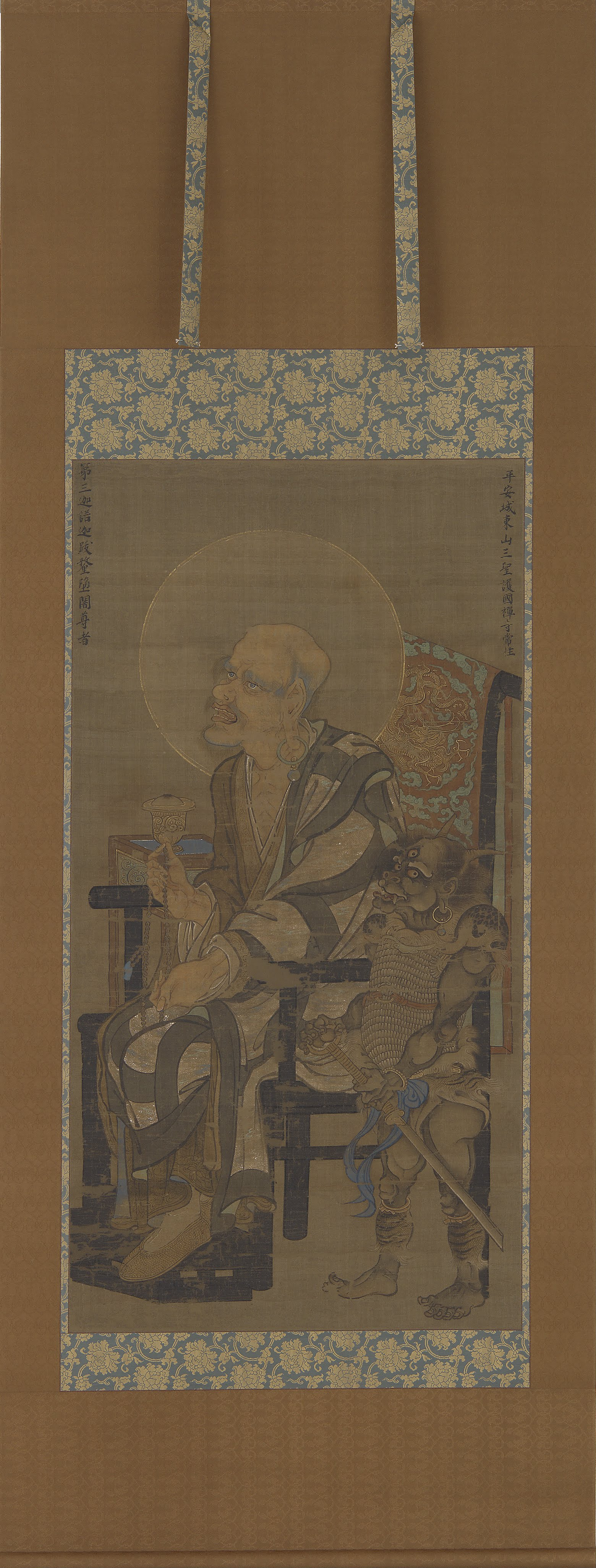
Buddhist Luohan by Ryōzen. Hanging scroll. Nanboku-chō period, mid-14th century

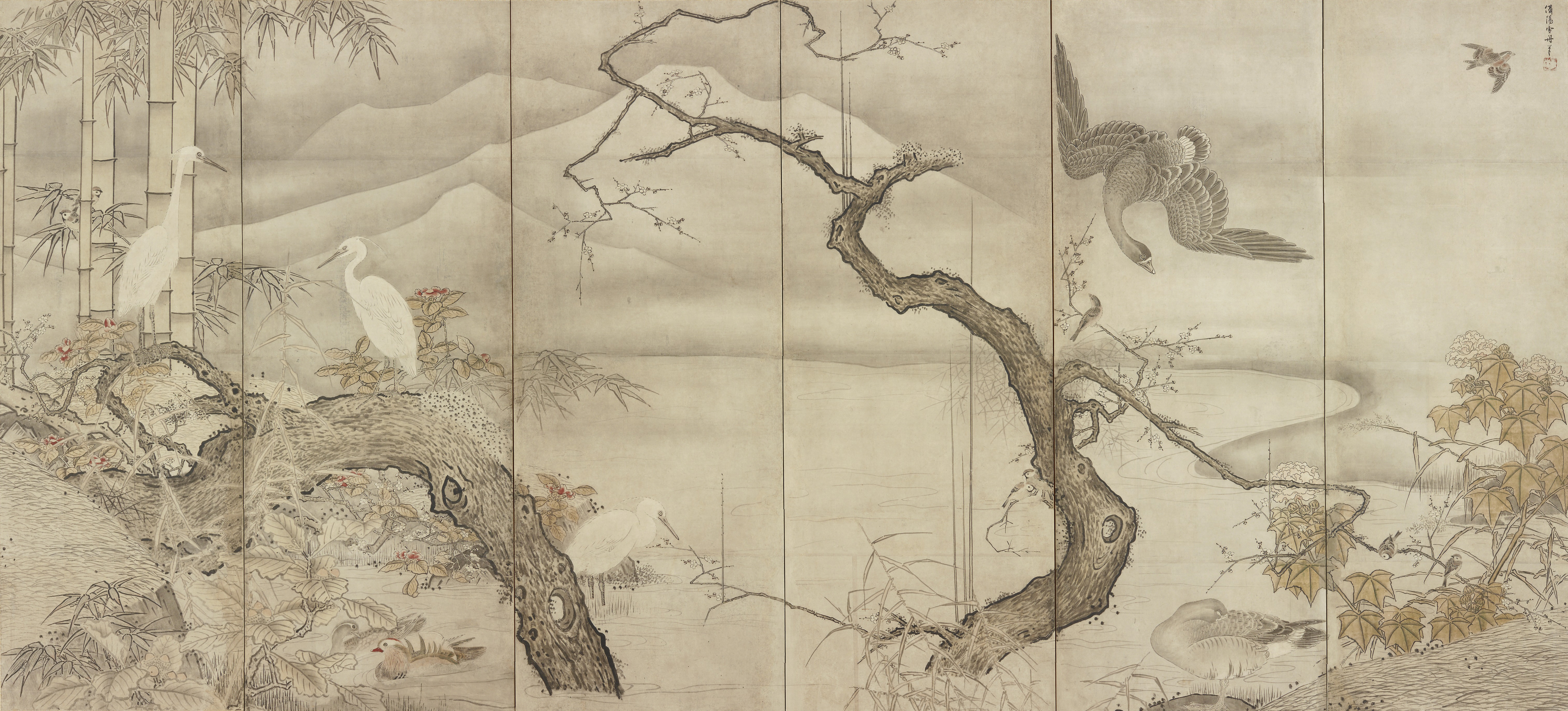
Birds and Flowers of the Four Seasons: Autumn and Winter by Sesshū Tōyō. Screen (six-panel). Muromachi period, late 15th-early 16th century

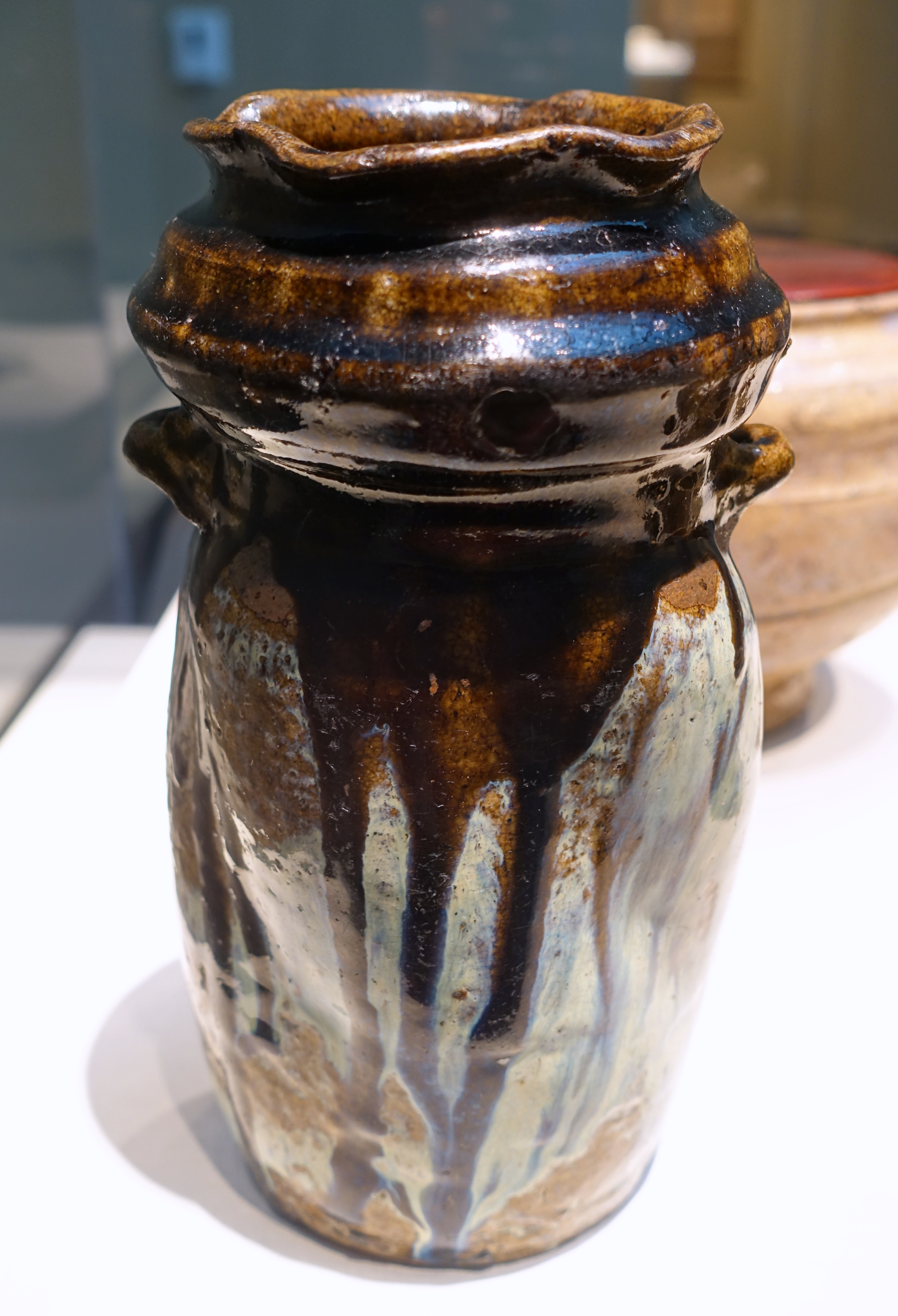
Karatsu Vase, with lacquer lid for use as tea ceremony water jar. Momoyama period, 1596-1615

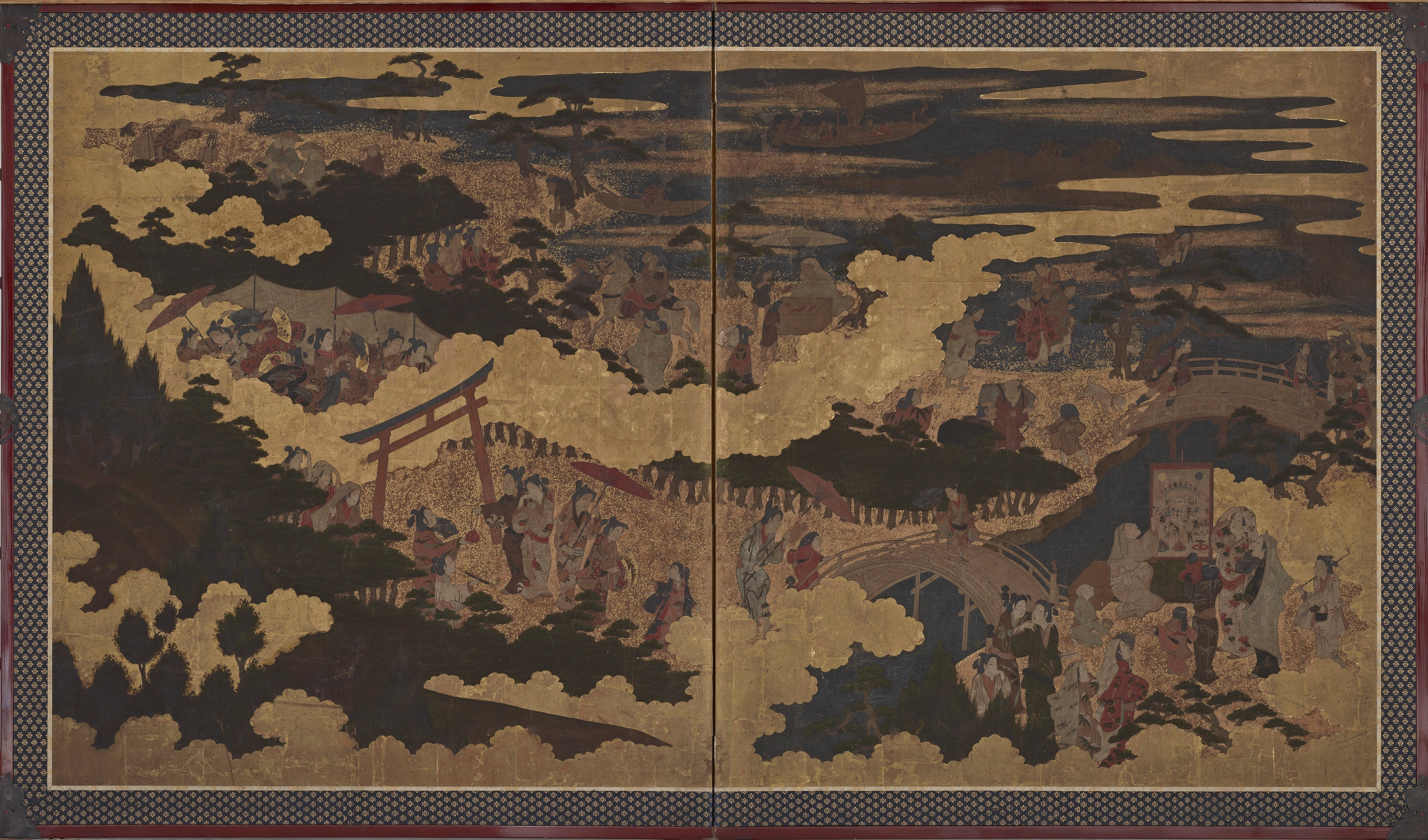
A festival at the Sumiyoshi Shrine. Color and gold on paper. Edo period, early 17th century

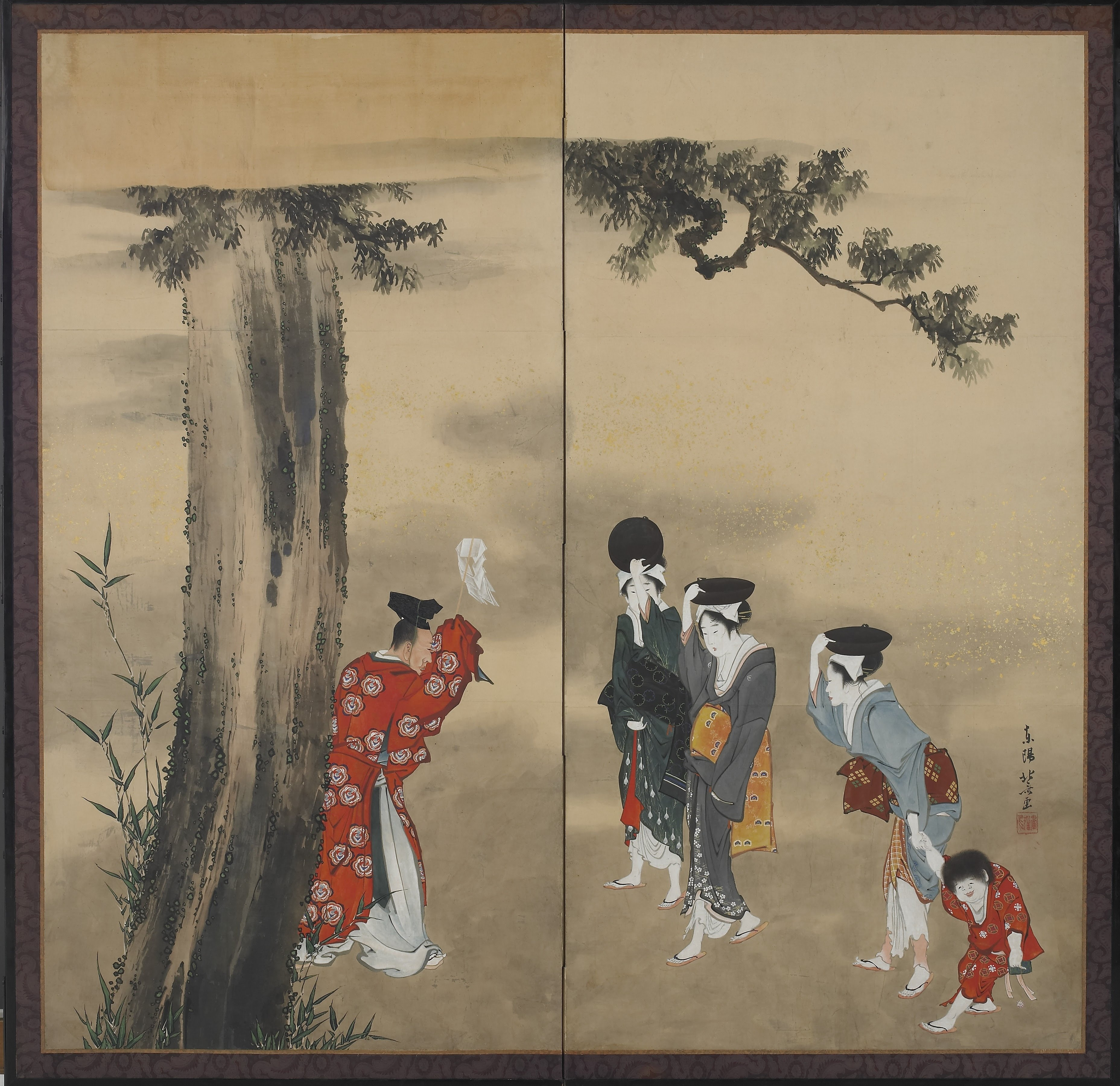
A Shinto Priest, Three Women and a Child by Katsushika Hokusai. Ink, gold, and color on paper. Edo period, ca. 1799-1801

=== Korean Art ===
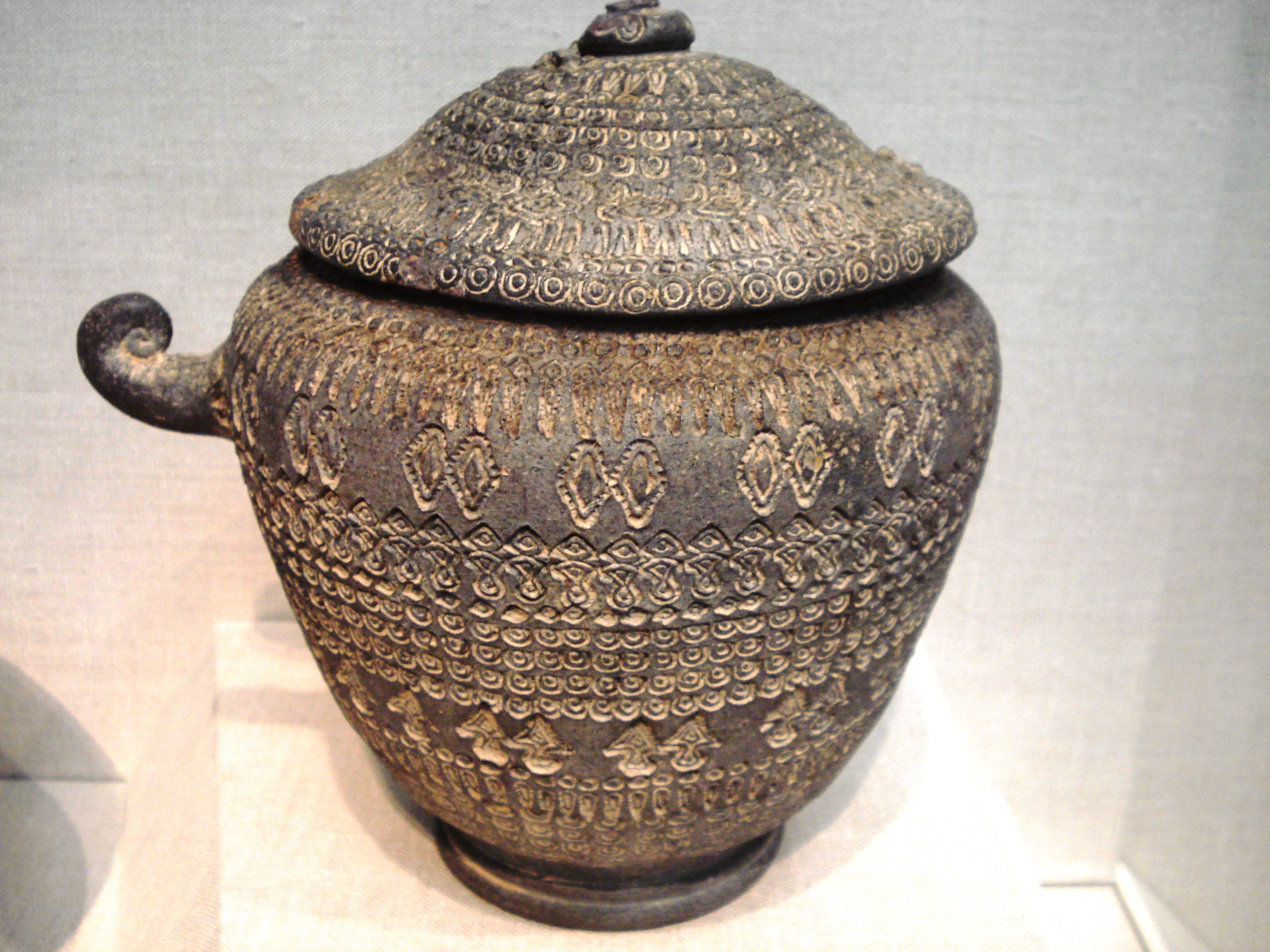
Cinerary urn. Unglazed stoneware. Silla, early 8th century

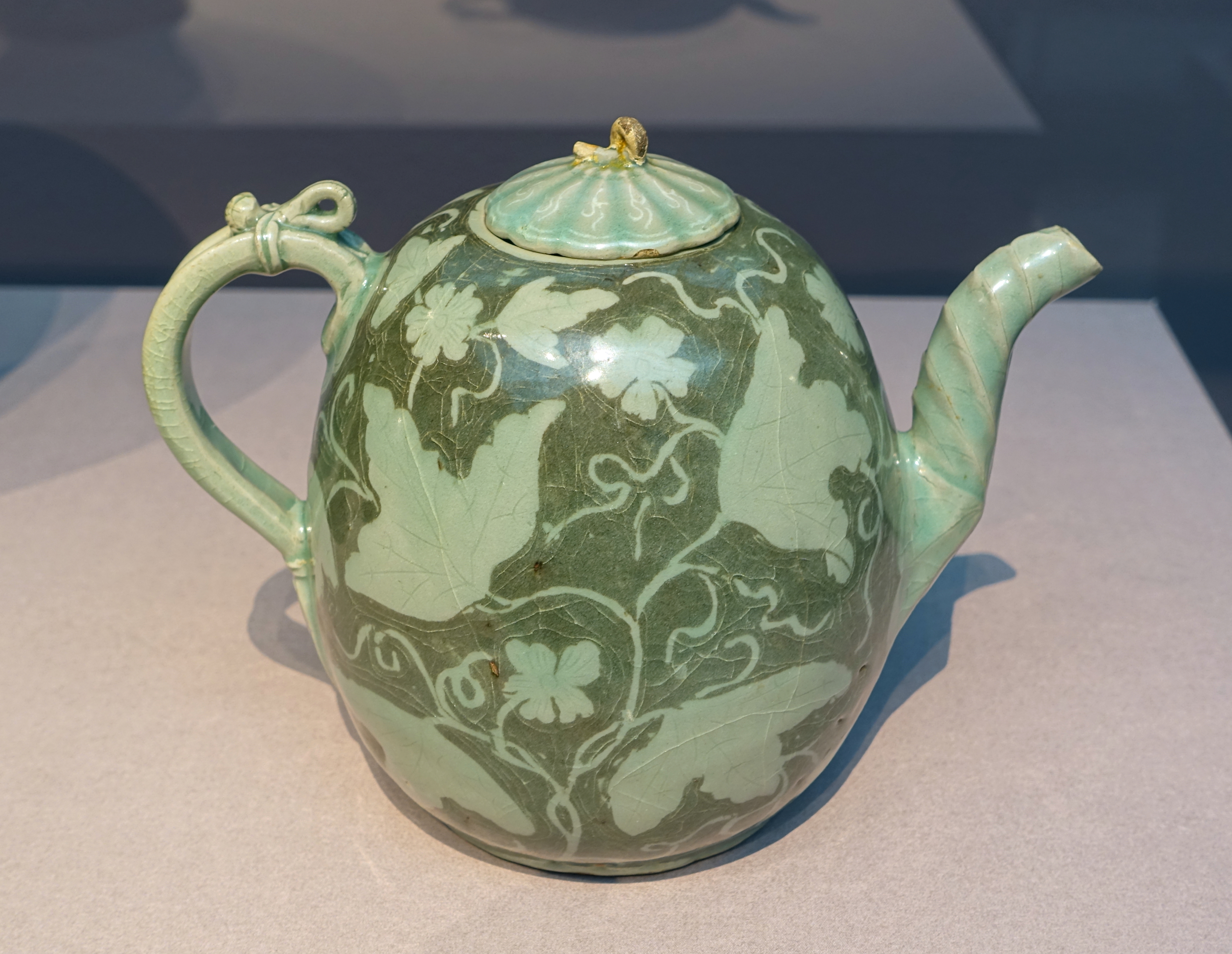
Wine ewer in the form of a melon. Stoneware with black inlay under celadon glaze. Gangjin kilns, Goryeo period, second half of 12th-early 13th century

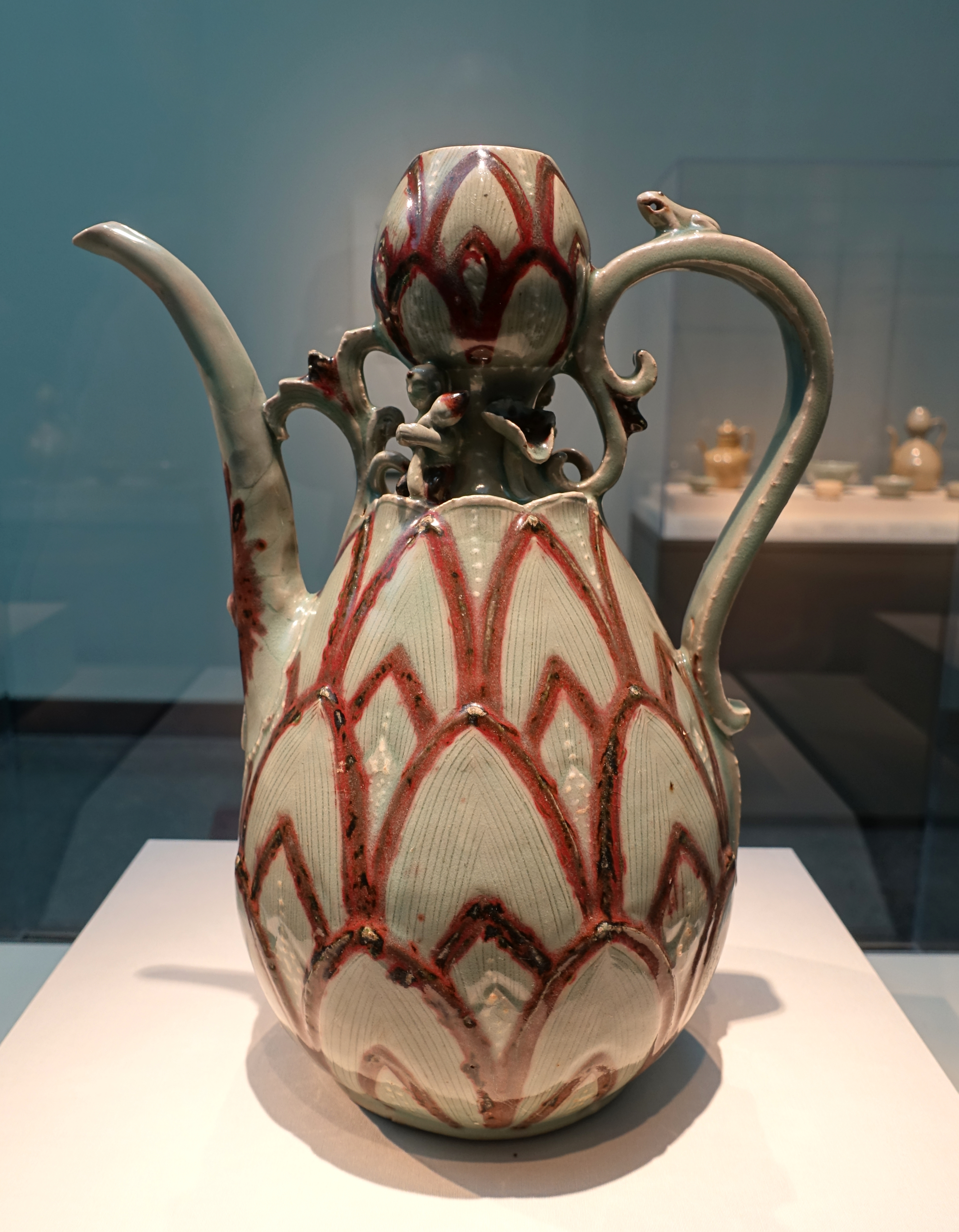
Ewer. Stoneware with copper-red pigment and white slip under celadon glaze. Gangjin or Buan kilns, Goryeo period, mid 13th century

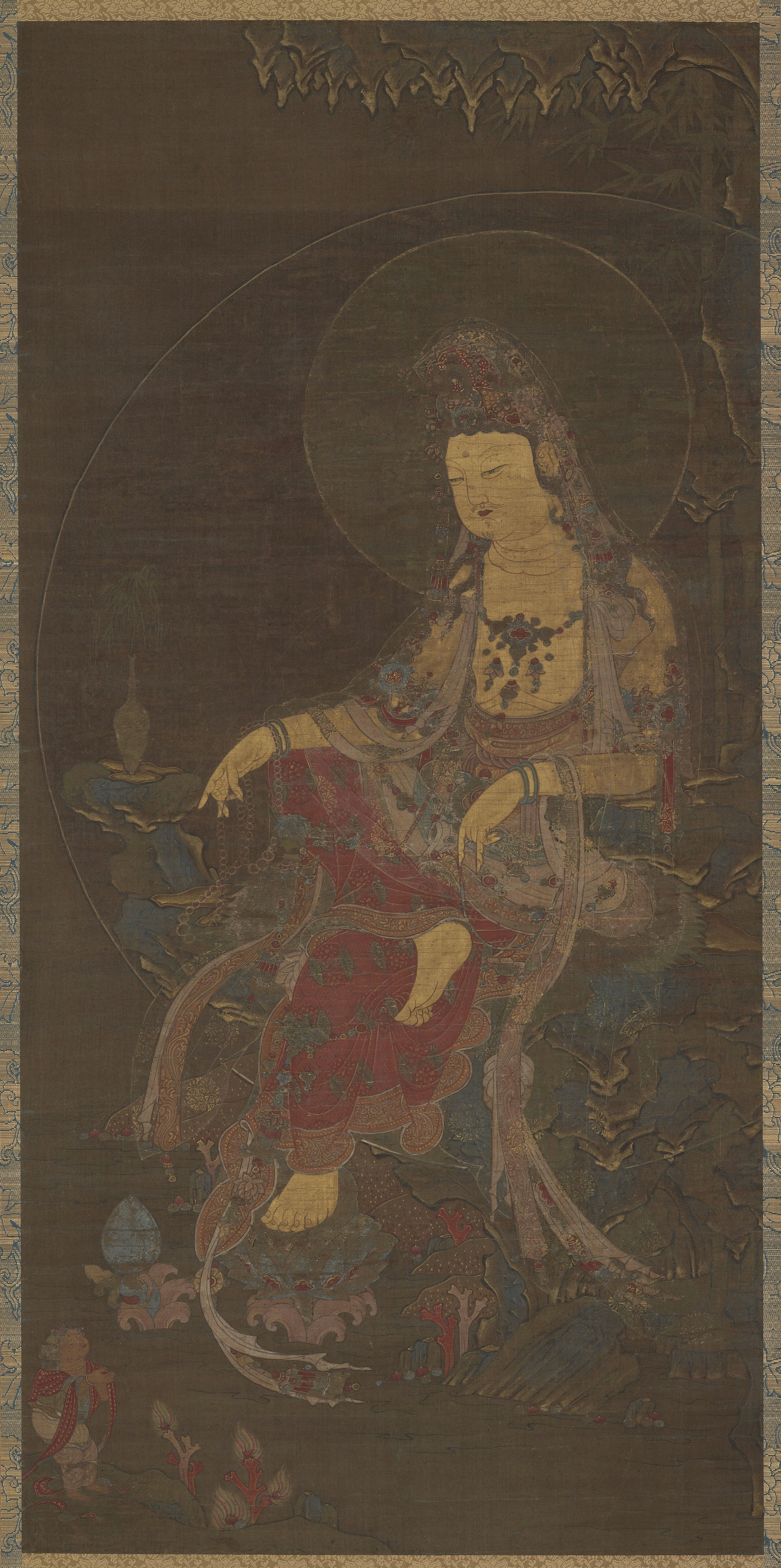
Water-moon Avalokiteśvara (Suwol Gwaneum bosal). Ink, color and gold on silk. Late Goryeo period, mid-14th century

=== South Asian & Himalayan Art ===
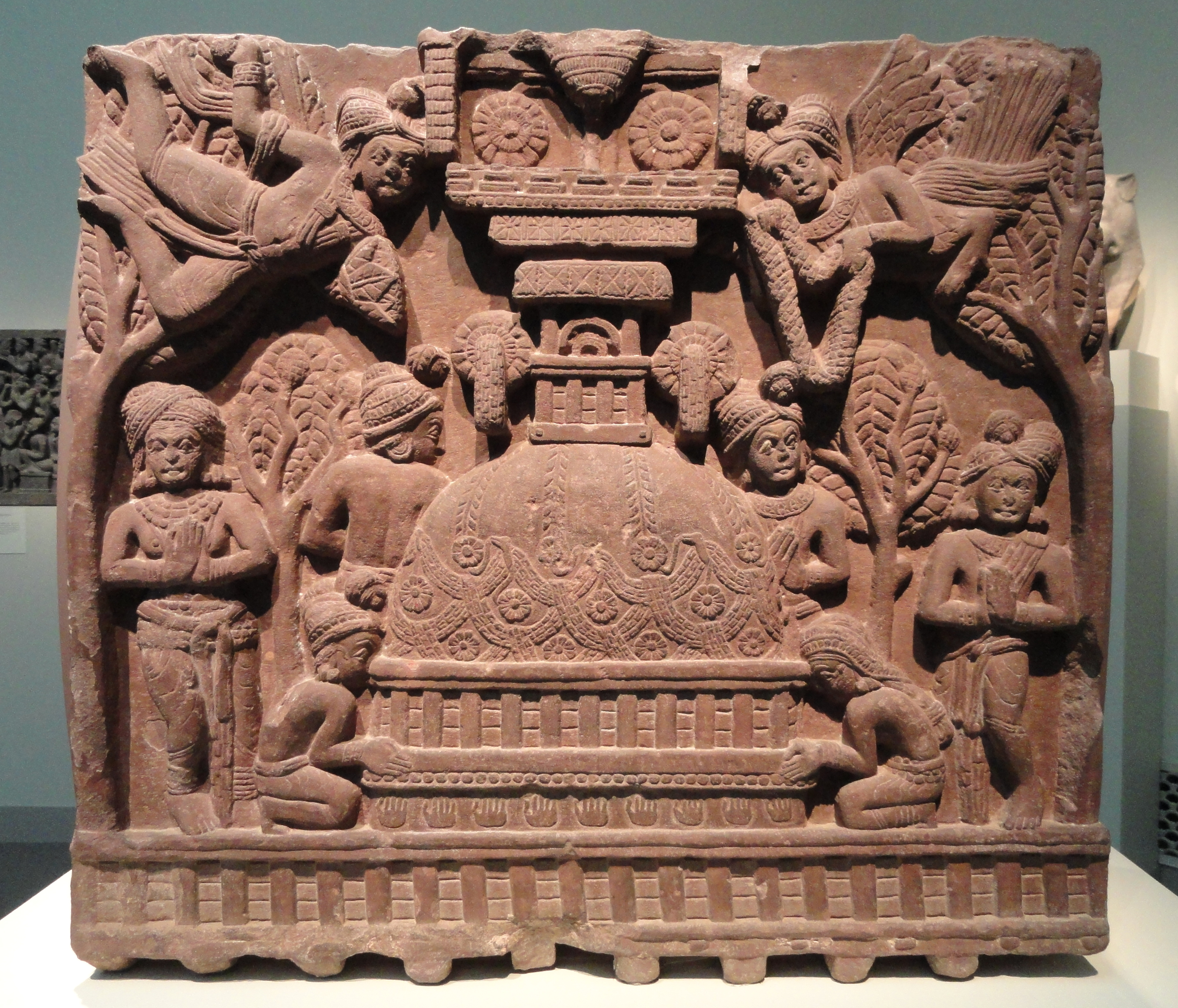
One face of a fence-rail from Bharhut: Worship at a Stupa. Sandstone. Madhya Pradesh, India, early 2nd century BCE

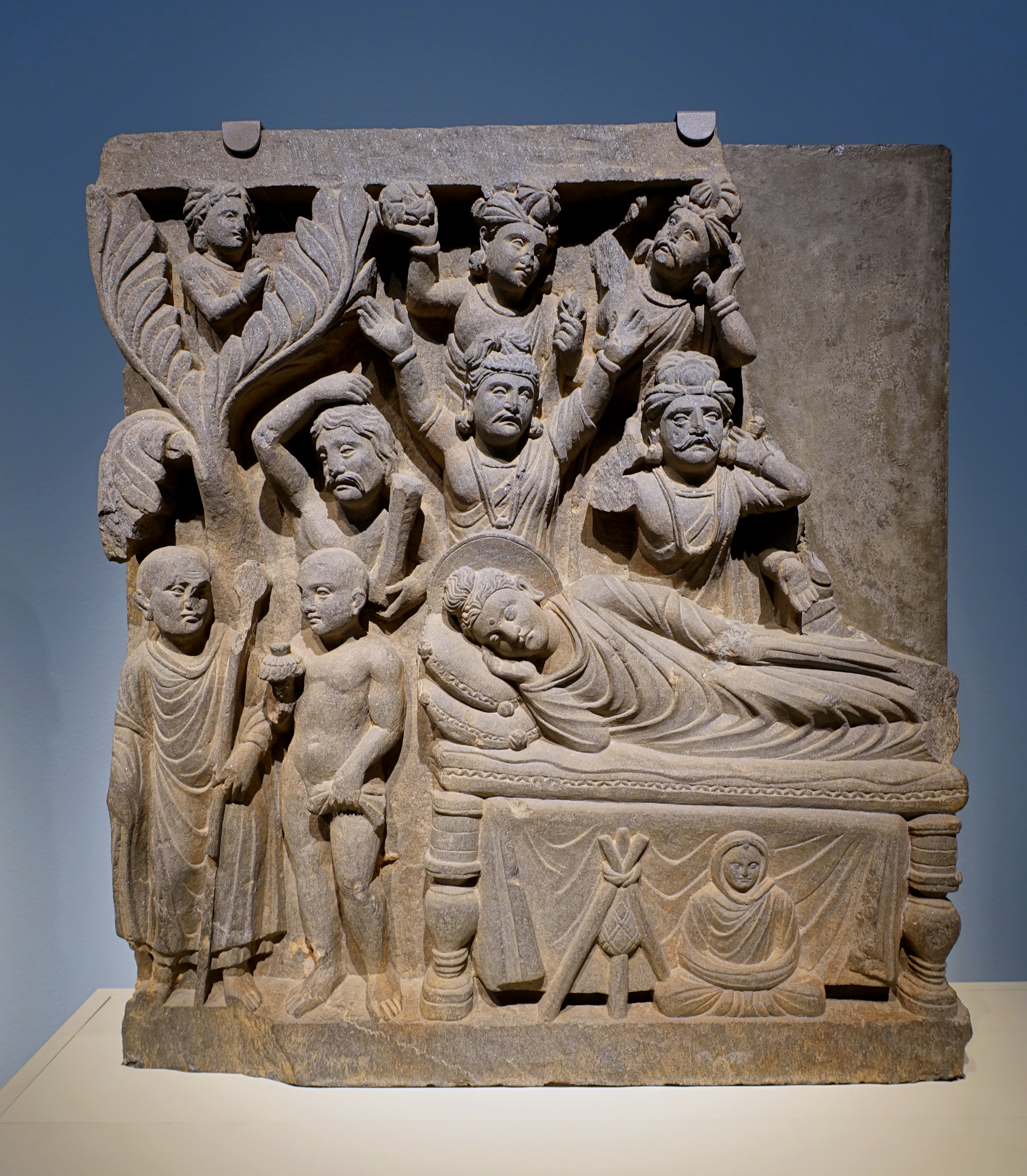
Four Scenes from the Life of the Buddha - (Detail) Parinirvana. Stone. Gandhara art, Pakistan or Afghanistan, Kushan period, late 2nd-early 3rd century

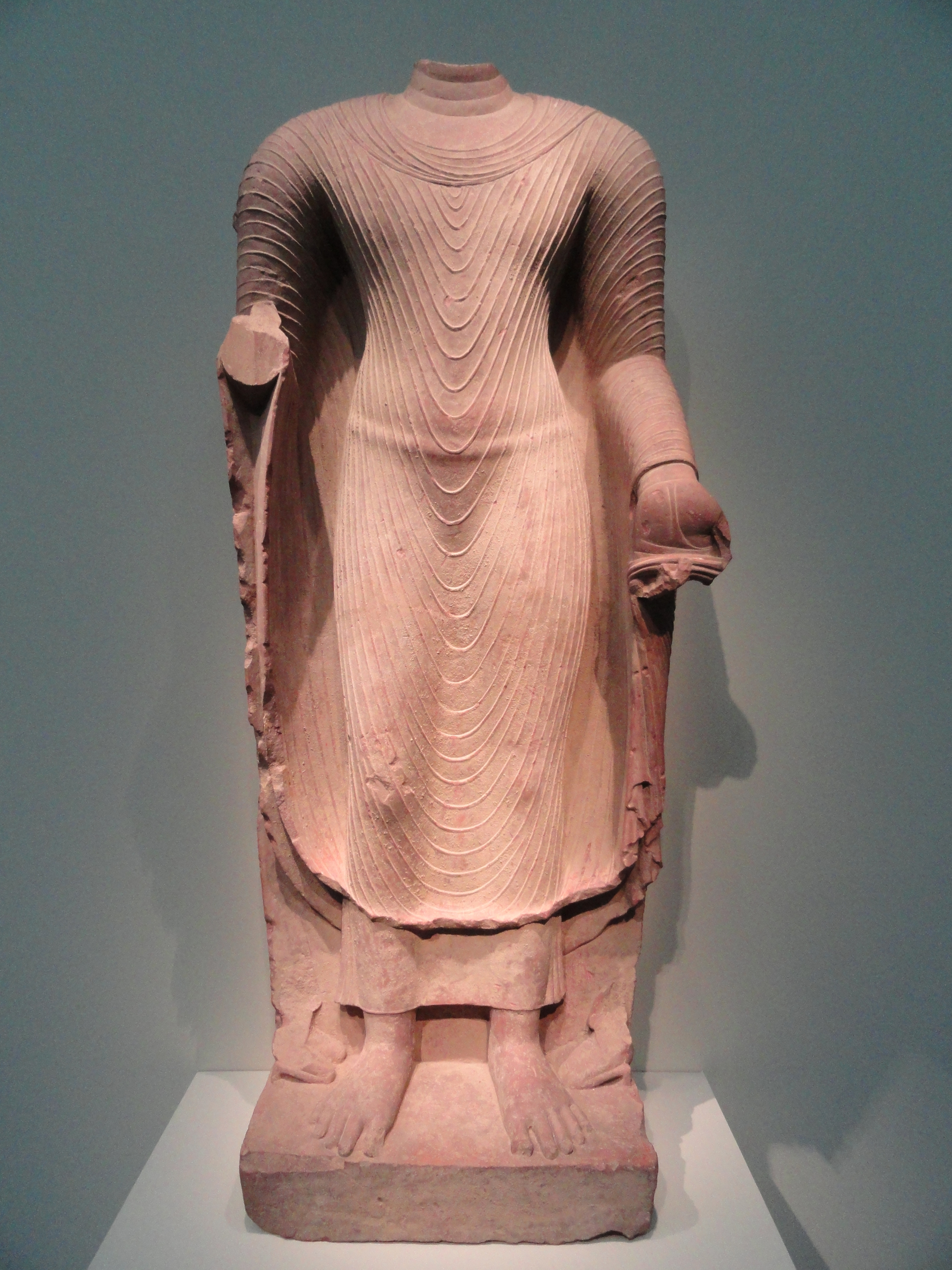
Standing Buddha. Red sikri sandstone. Mathura, Gupta period, 320-485

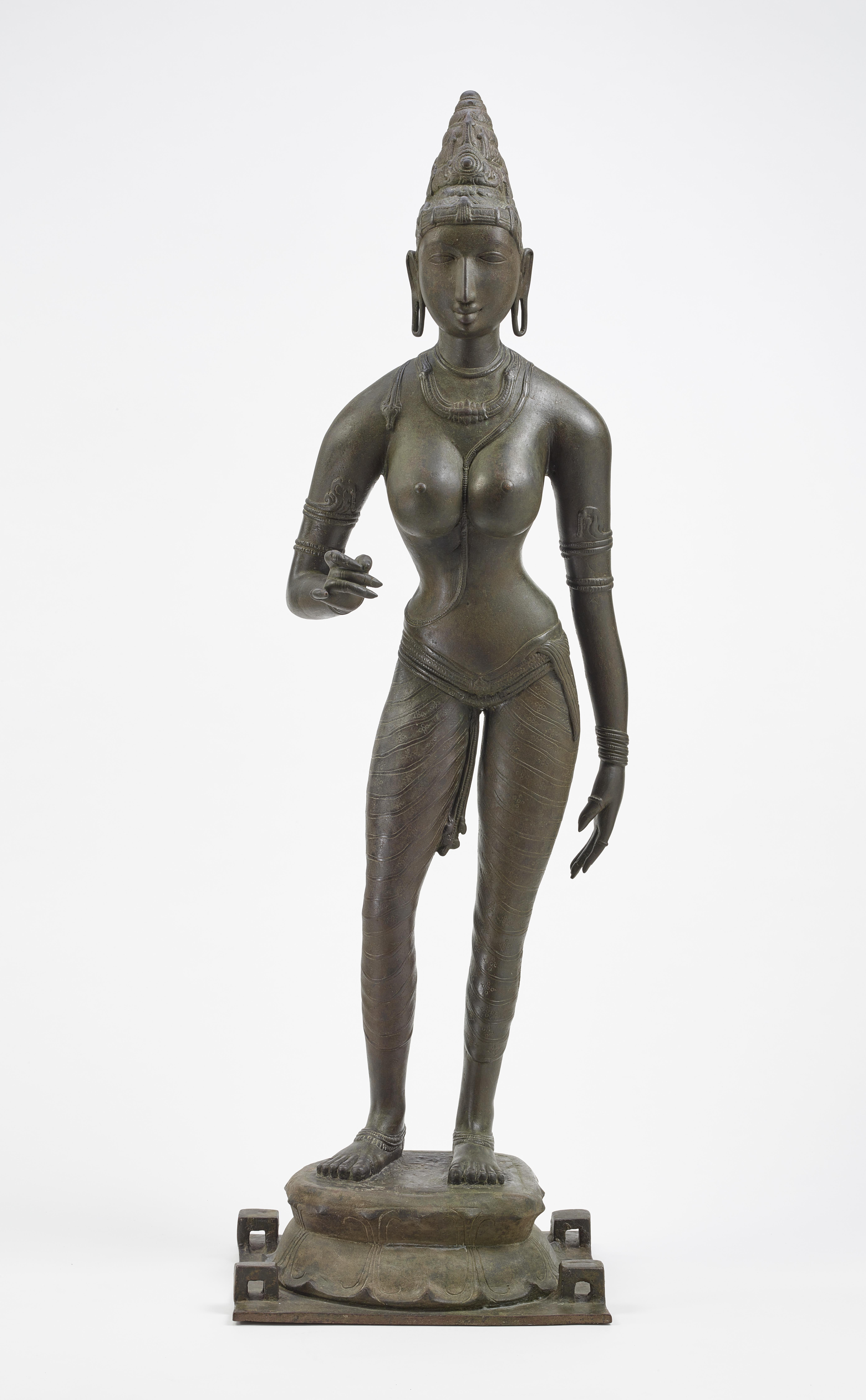
Queen Sembiyan Mahadevi as the Goddess Parvati. Bronze. Chola dynasty, 10th century

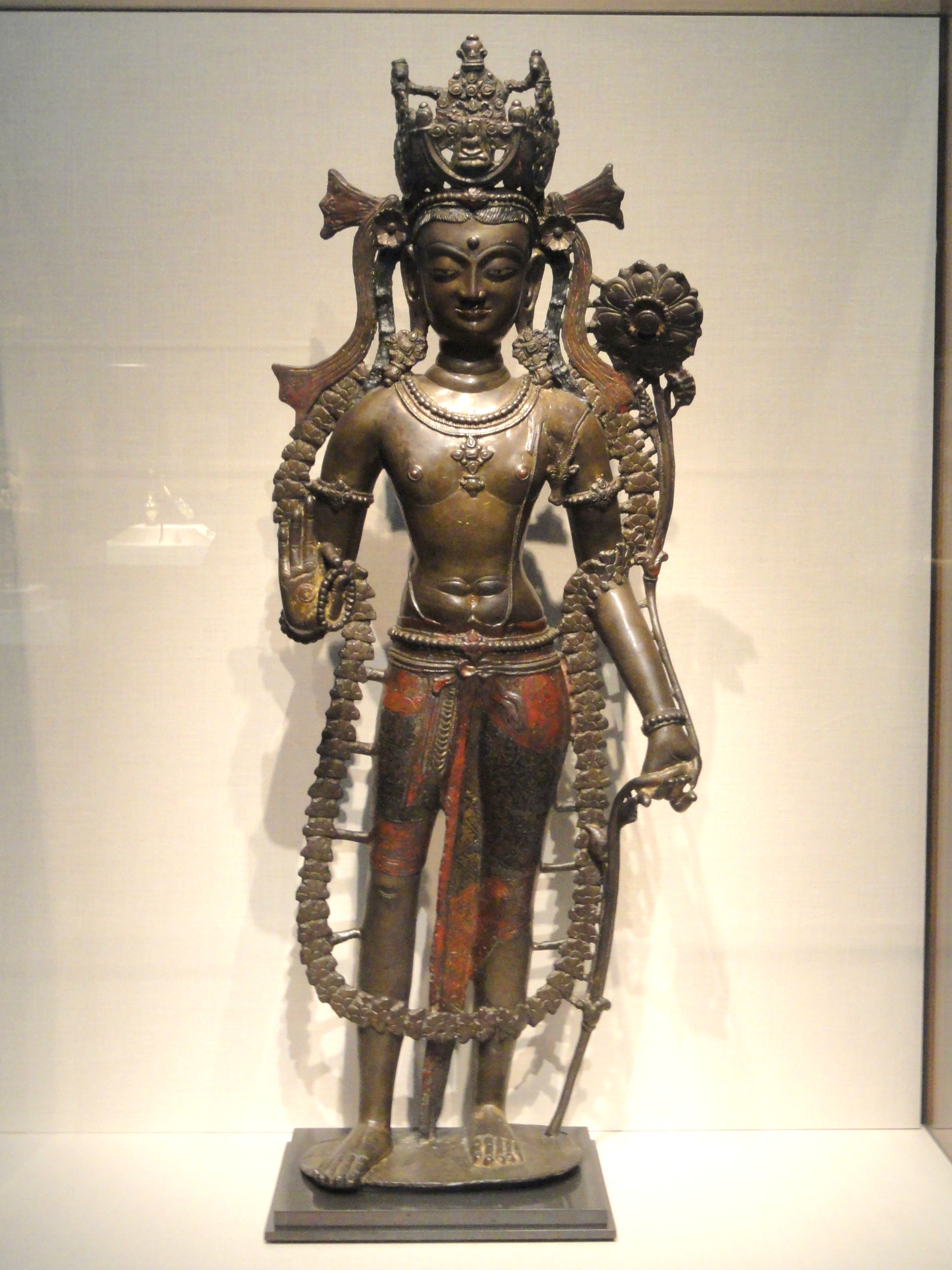
The Bodhisattva Avalokiteshvara. Brass alloy with copper and tin inlay. Western Tibet, 11th century

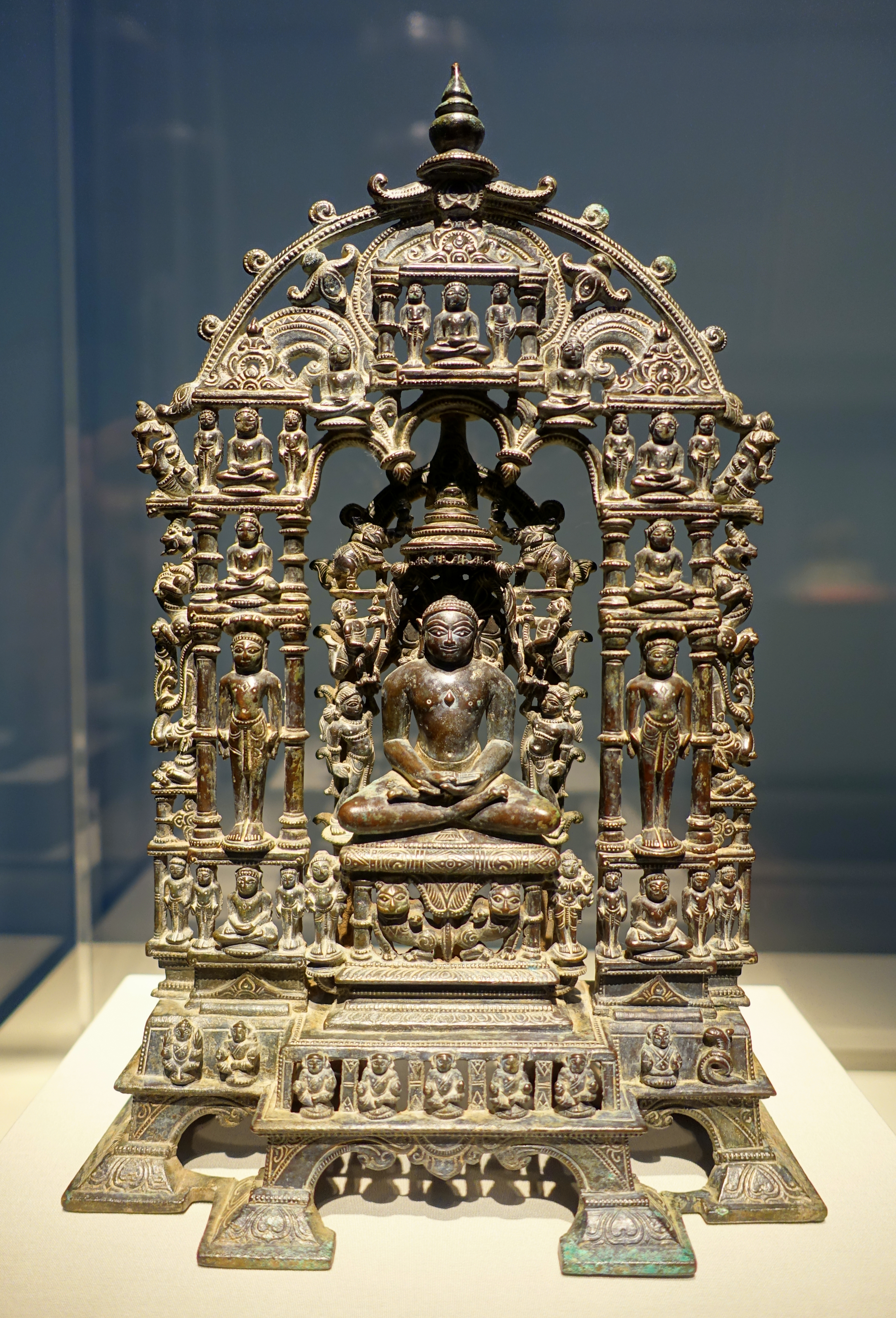
Jain shrine of Parshvanatha. Copper alloy. Khajuraho region, 1097

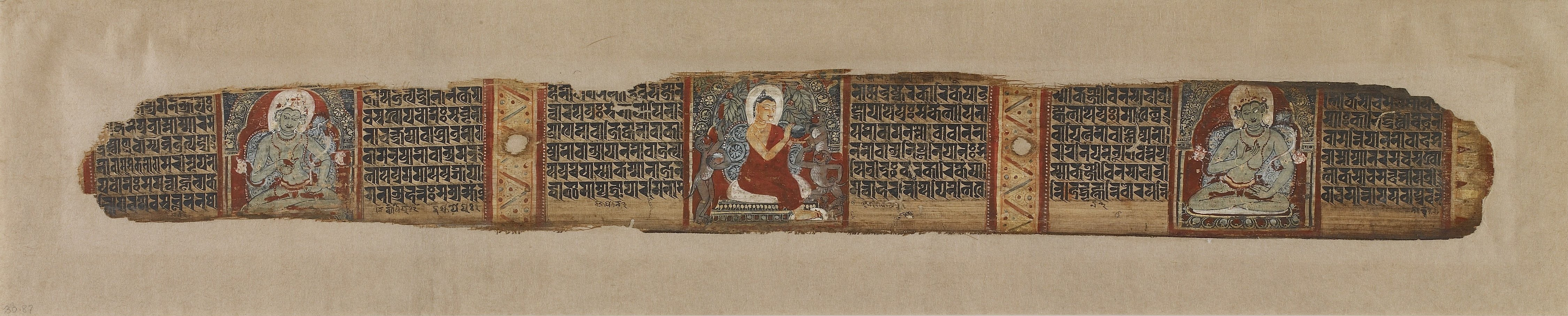
The Buddha distributes honey, from a Prajnaparamita manuscript. Opaque watercolor and ink on palm leaf. West Bengal, 12th century

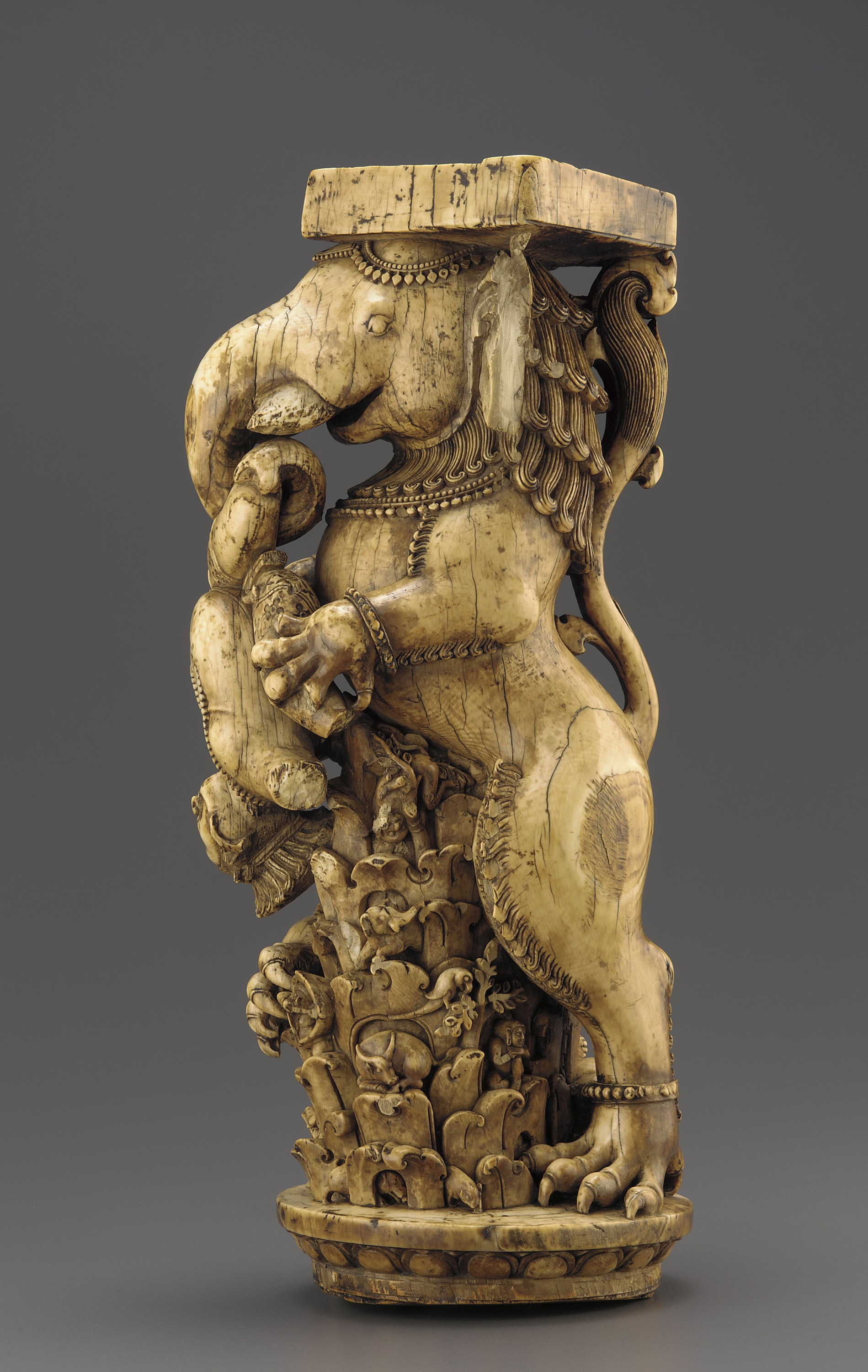
Ivory Throne Leg. Eastern Ganga dynasty, 13th century

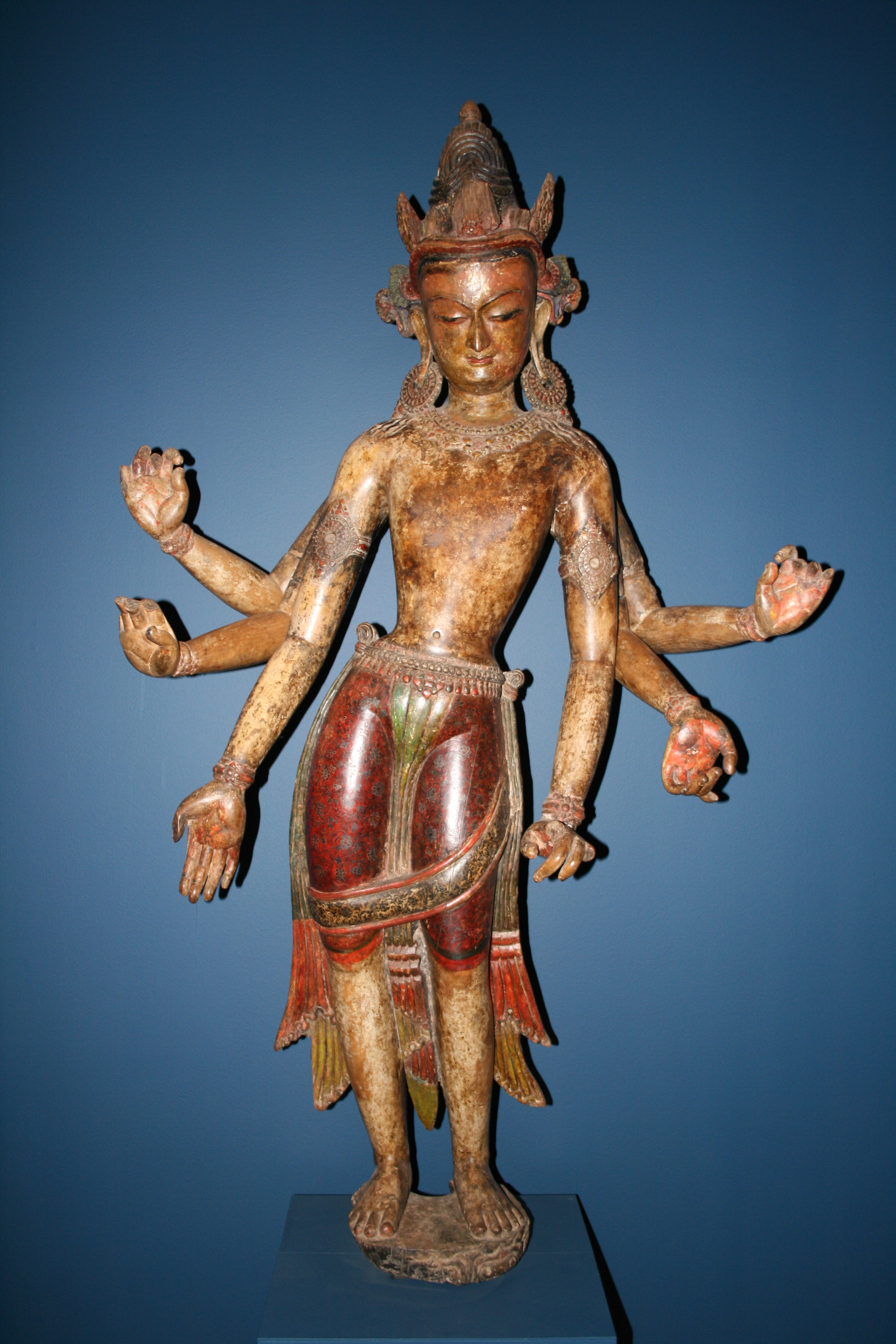
Bodhisattva White Avalokiteshvara (Amoghapasha Lokeshvara). Wood and polychromy. Nepal, 14th century

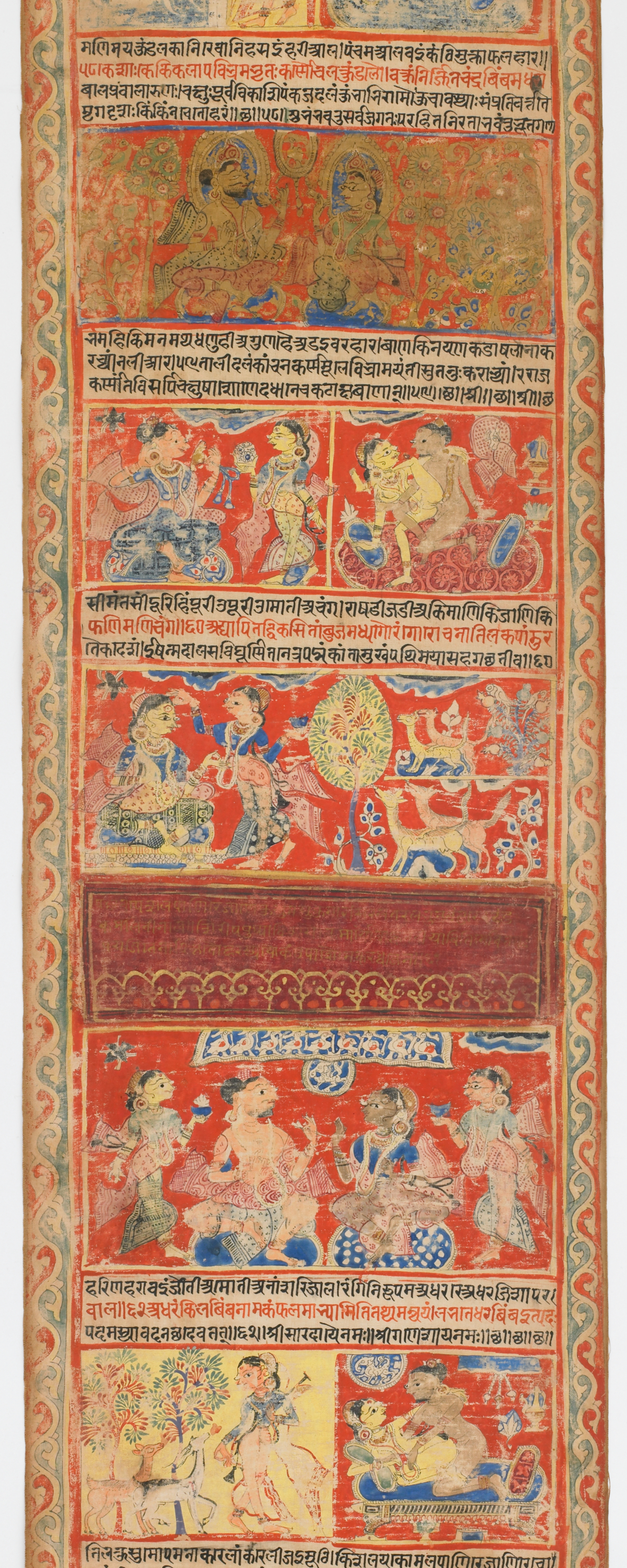
Vasantavilas (detail). Scroll. Opaque watercolor, ink and gold on paper mounted on cloth. Gujarat, 1451

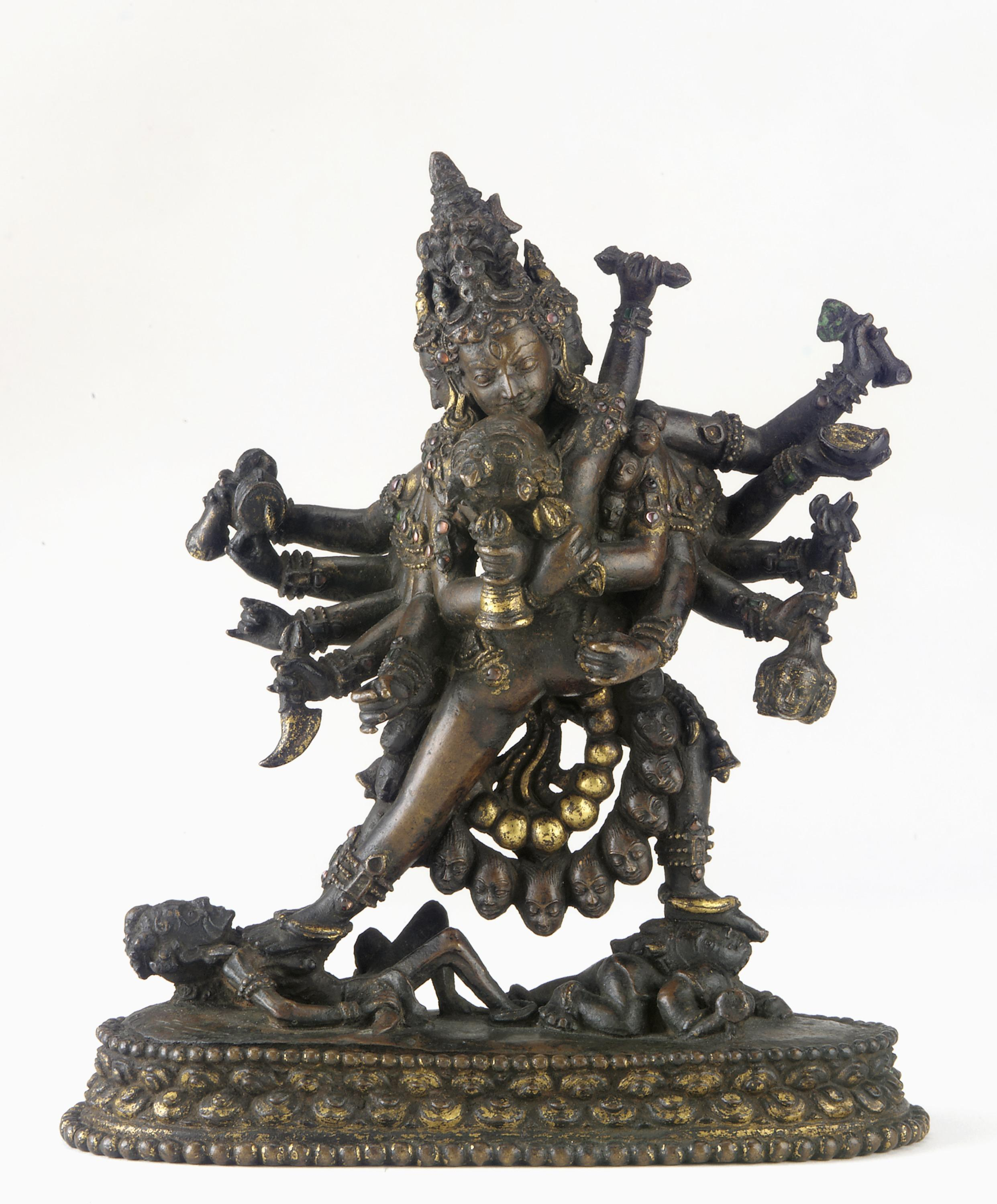
Sri Cakrasamvara and Vajravarahi. Copper, gilt, jewel inlay. Nepal, 16th-17th century

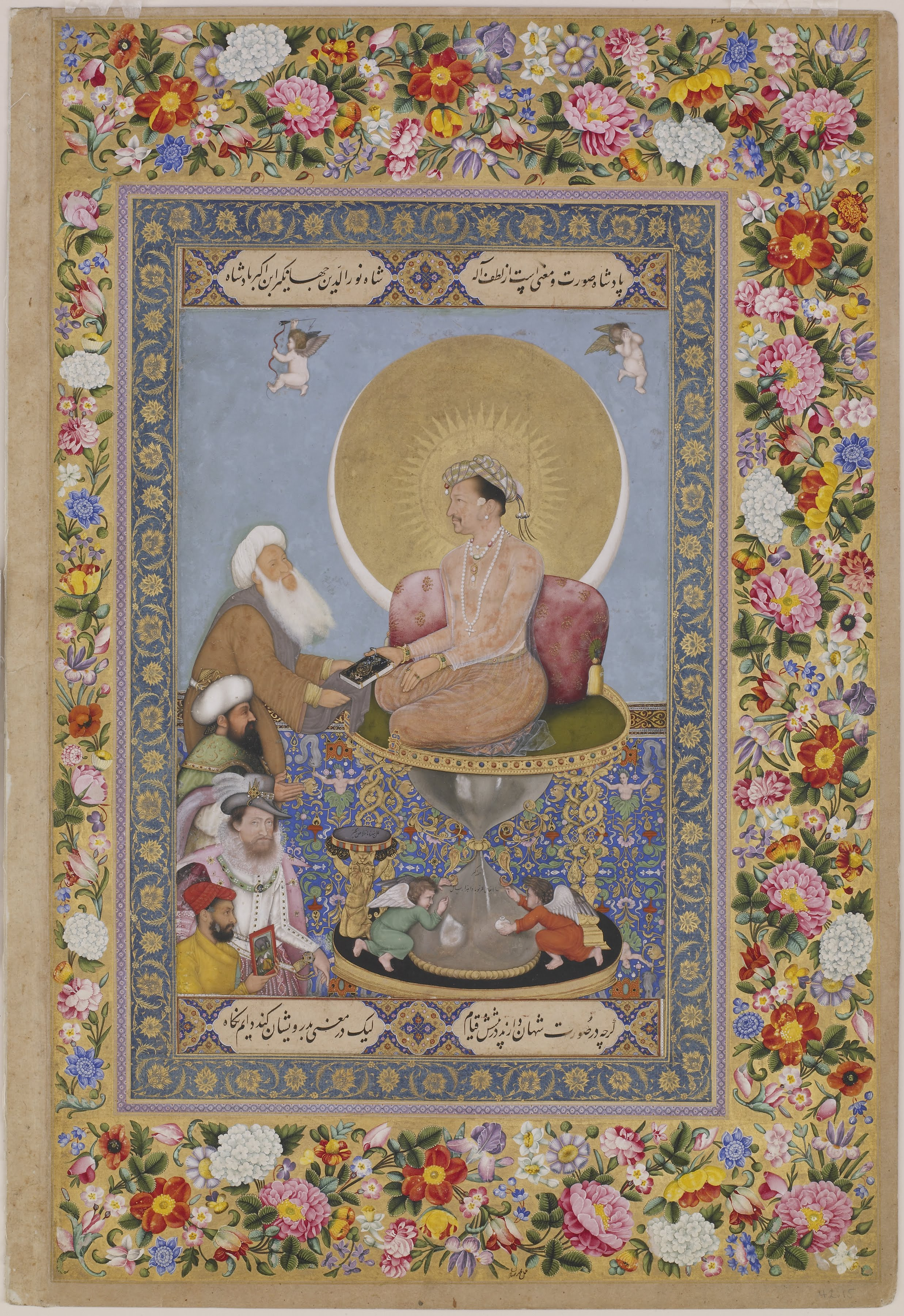
Jahangir Preferring a Sufi Shaikh to Kings by Bichitr. Opaque watercolor, ink and gold on paper. Mughal, c. 1615-1618

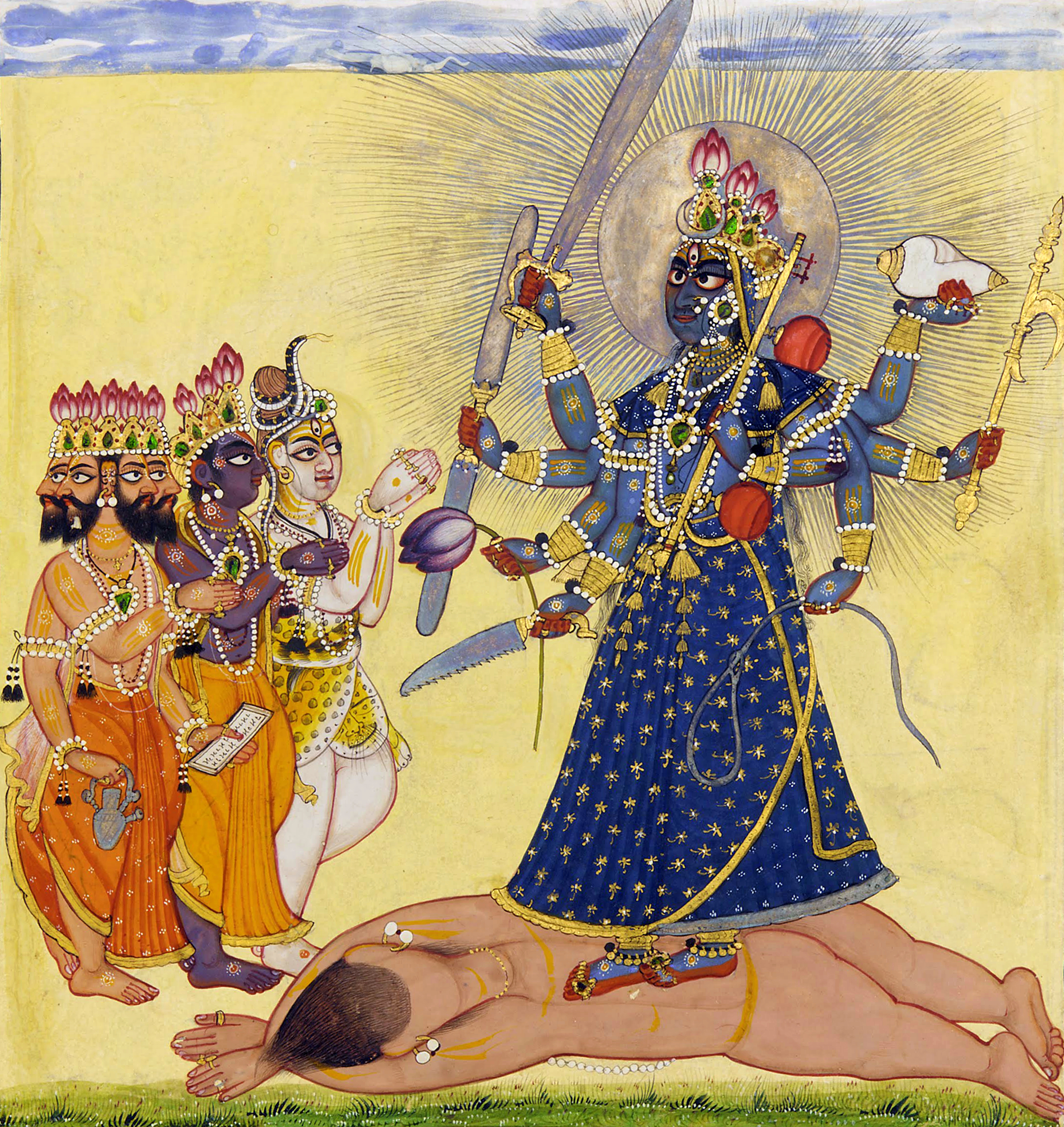
Goddess Bhadrakali Worshipped by the Gods from a tantric Devi series. Opaque watercolor, gold, silver and beetle wing cases on paper. Pahari, Punjab Hills, c. 1660-1670

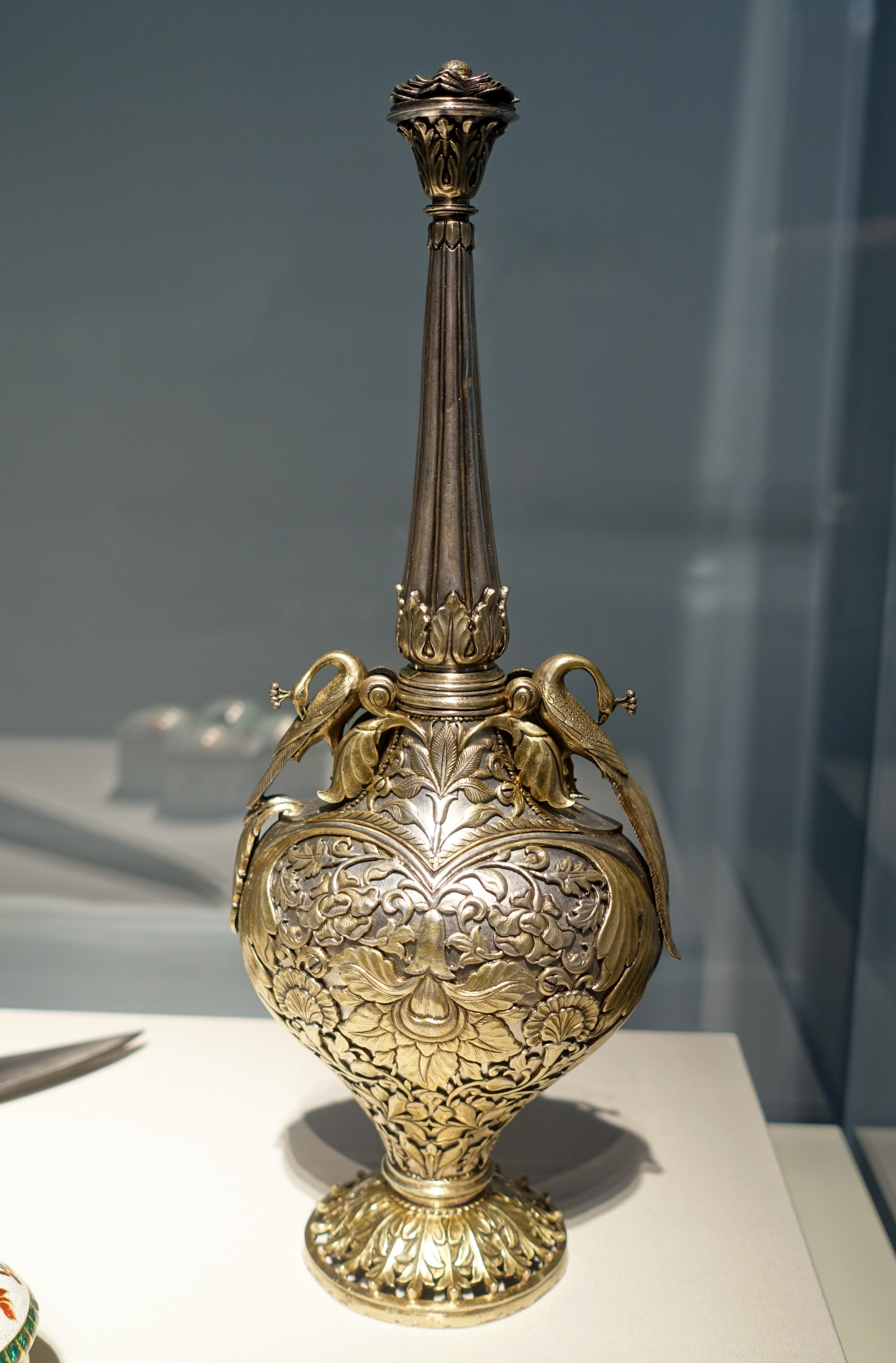
Rosewater sprinkler. Silver and gold. India, c. 1775-1800

=== Southeast Asian Art ===
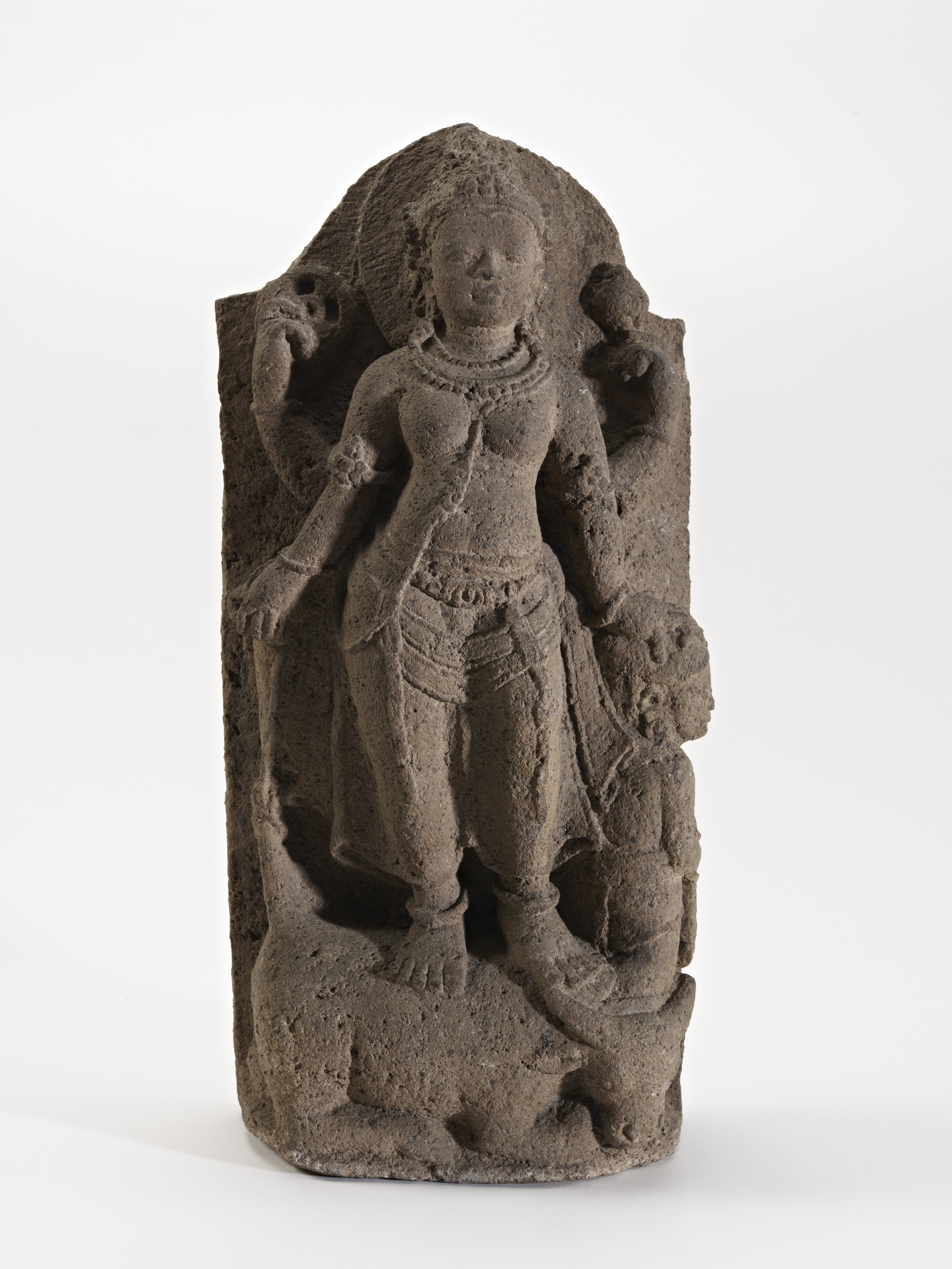
Durga Mahishasuramardini (“Slayer of the Buffalo Demon”). Stone (andesite). Central Javanese Period, 9th century

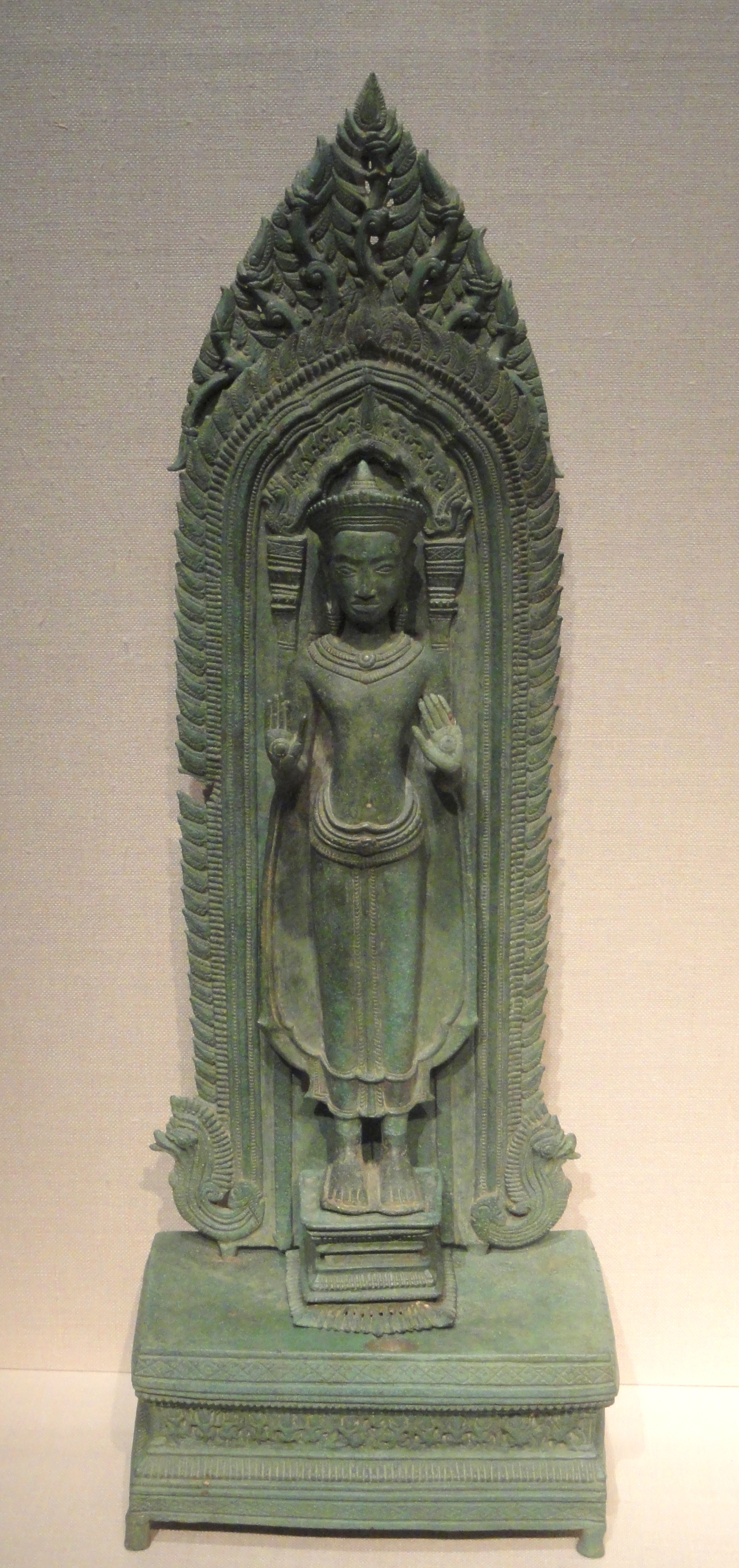
Standing Buddha and tabernacle. Bronze. Thailand, 12th-13th century

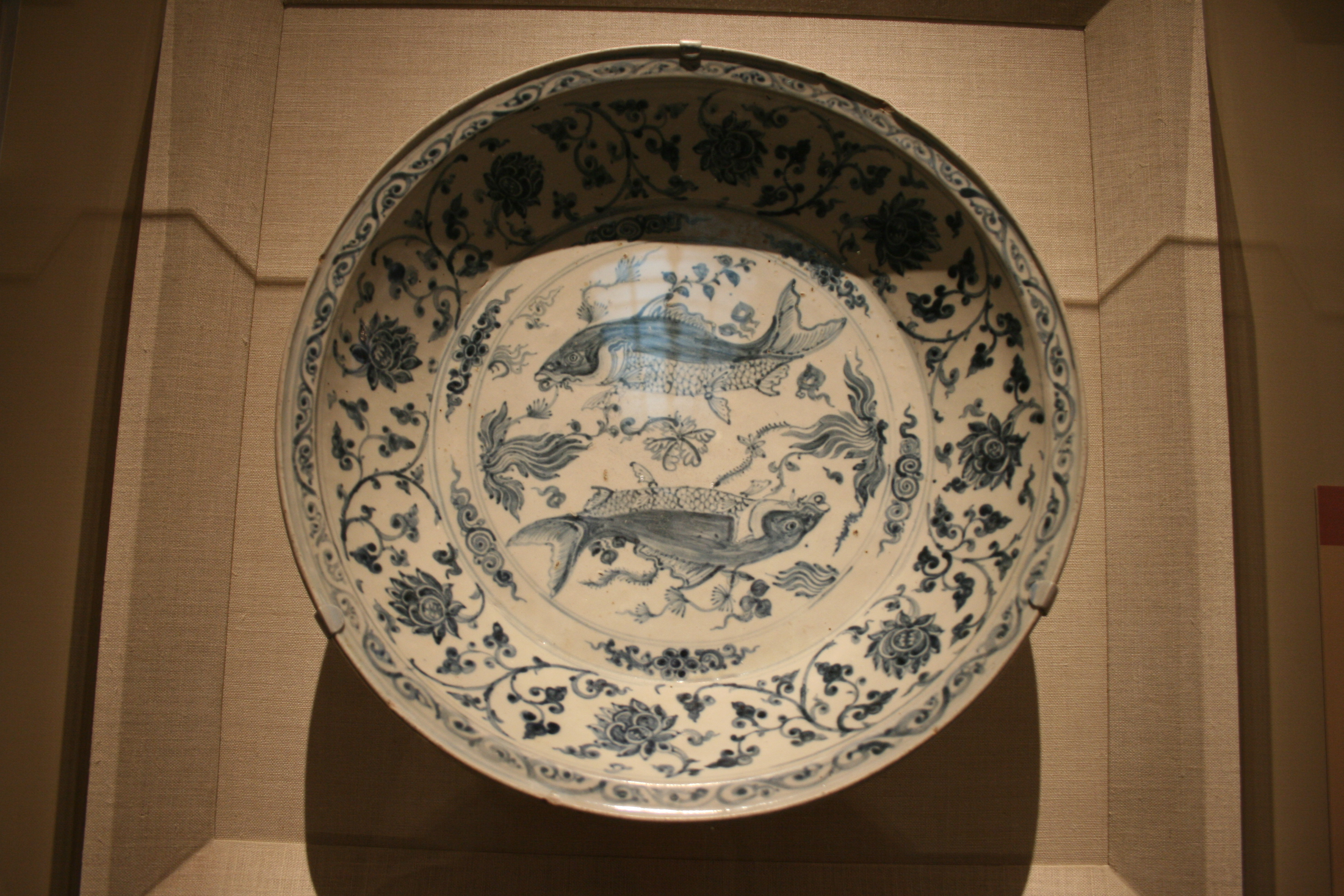
Dish. Stoneware with white slip and cobalt pigment under colorless glaze. Red River Delta kilns, Lê dynasty, 15th-century

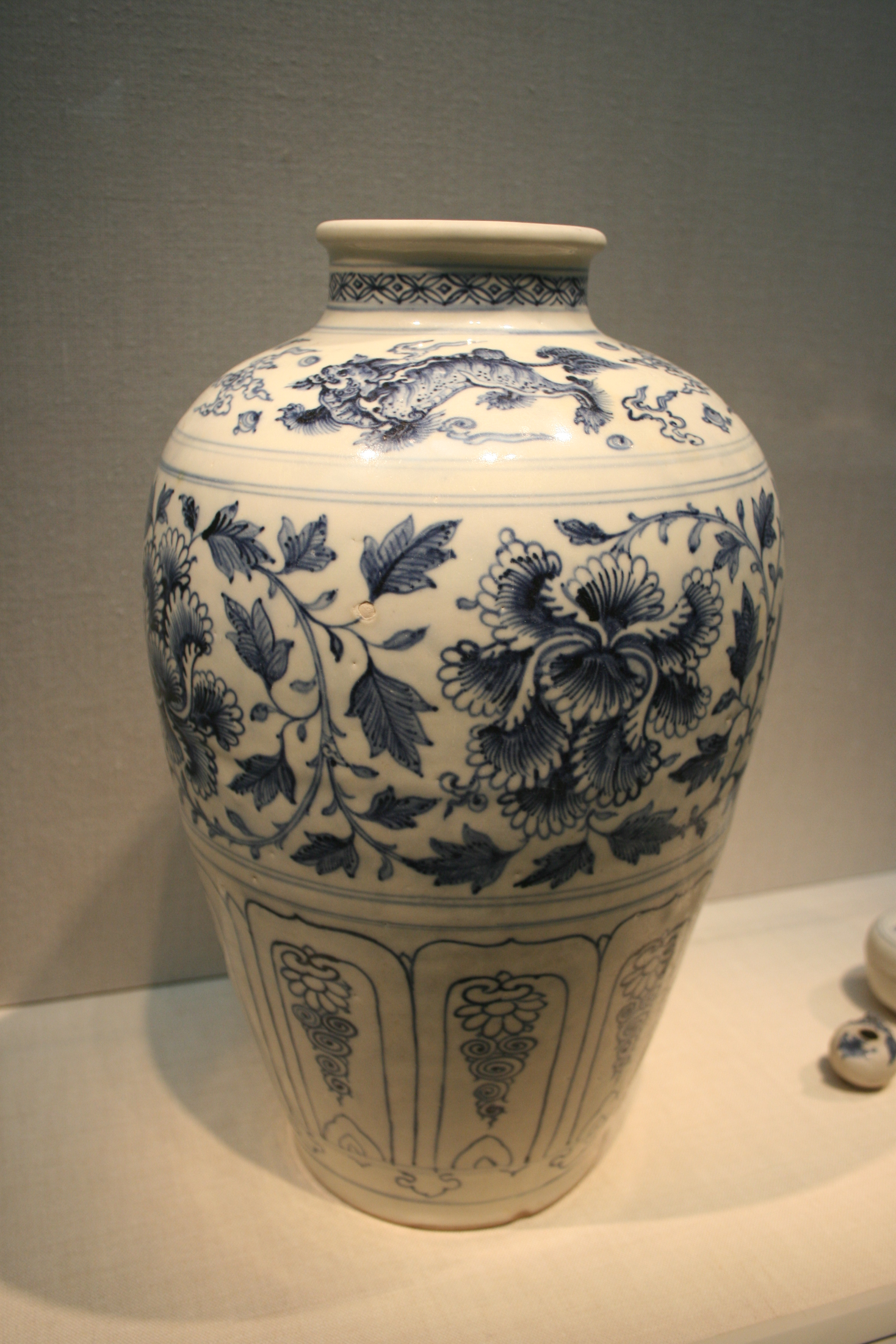
Jar. Stoneware with cobalt pigment under clear glaze. Red River Delta kilns, Lê dynasty, 15th-century

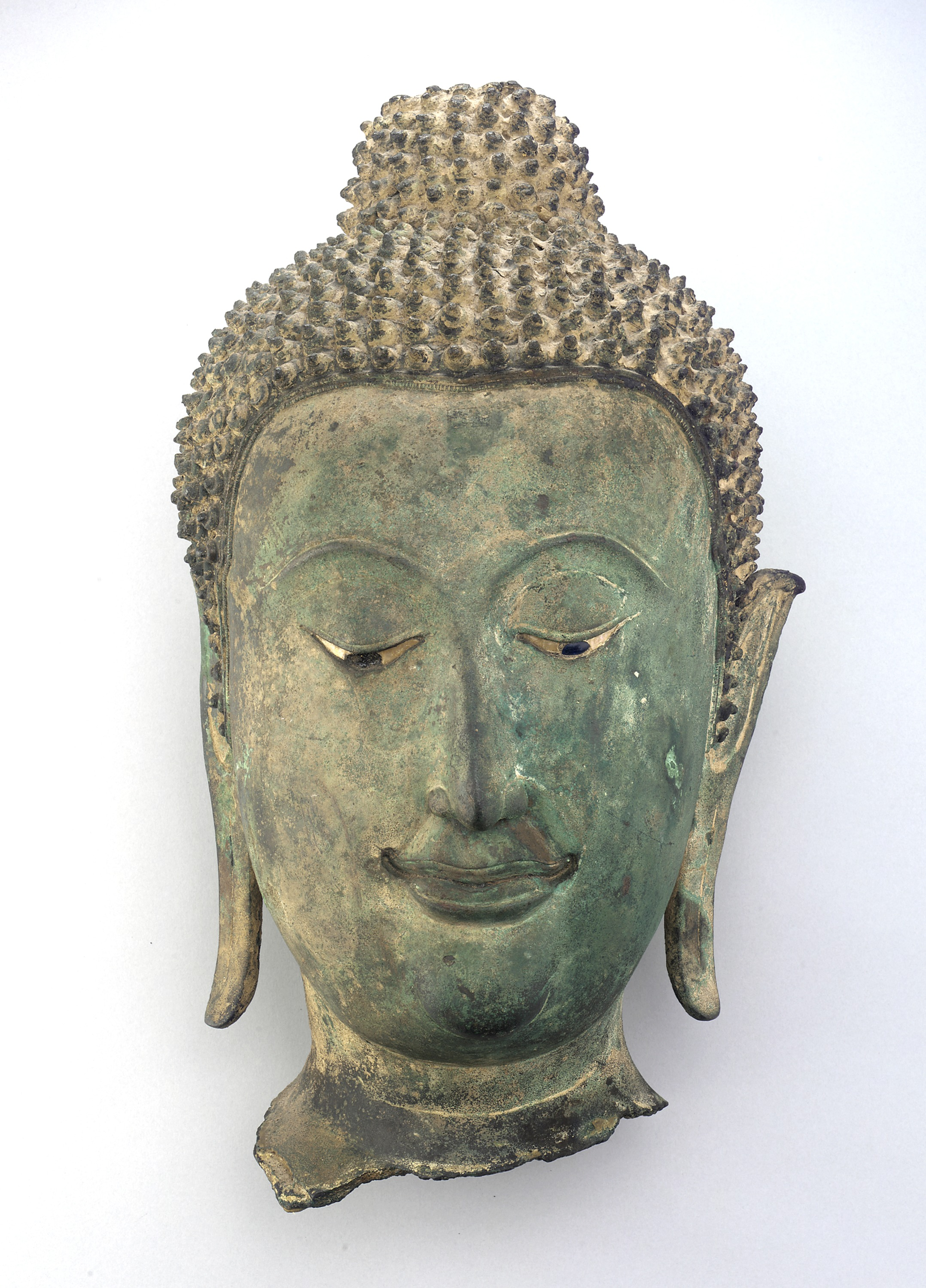
Head of a Buddha. Bronze with glass and mother-of-pearl. Thailand, Ayutthaya period, ca. 1700

== See also ==
- Biblical Manuscripts in the Freer Collection
- Pewabic Pottery
- Ernst Herzfeld and Persepolis
- Zhou Jichang
- Charles Lang Freer medal
- Lin Tinggui
- J. Keith Wilson
