= List of people with surname Yu =

Yu is the pinyin romanisation of several Chinese family names. However, in the Wade–Giles romanisation system, Yu is equivalent to You in pinyin. "Yu" may represent many different Chinese characters, including 余, 于, 由, 魚 (鱼), 漁, 渔, 楀, 俞, 喻, 兪, 於, 遇, 虞, 郁, 尉, 禹, 游, 尤, 庾, 娛, 娱, and 茹.

The most common of the Yu surnames are 于, 余, and 俞. In China, 0.62% of the population have the family name 于 in 2002 (about 7.4 million), and this surname is most common in Shandong province and northeastern China. Around 0.41% of the population have the surname 余 in 2002 (over five million), and it is most common in Jiangxi, Zhejiang and Fujian provinces. The 俞 surname represents around 0.12% of China's population.

== Historical figures ==
- Charles Yu Hsingling, late-Qing and Republican-era diplomat and engineer
- Yu Di, official and Chancellor of the Tang dynasty
- Yu Fan, official of Eastern Wu
- Yu Jin, general under warlord Cao Cao
- John Yu Shuinling, late-Qing and Republican-era diplomat and photographer
- Lizzie Yu Der Ling, late-Qing and Republican-era writer
- Nellie Yu Roung Ling, late-Qing and Republican-era modern dancer and fashion designer

== Modern figures ==
- Yok Mu-ming, Chairman of the New Party
- Derek Yu, video game designer
- Yu Yunbo (1936–2022), Chinese politician
