= Princess Der Ling (TV series) =

- Der Ling (left in red), portrayed by Zhang Jingjing, and her sister Roung Ling, portrayed by Sun Yifei.
- Also known as: Secret Files of the Qing Imperial Palace: Princess Der Ling
- Genre: Historical drama
- Based on: Princess Der Ling by Xu Xiaobin
- Written by: Xu Xiaobin; Li Xuebing
- Directed by: Han Gang
- Starring: Zhang Jingjing; Sun Yifei; Lü Zhong; Jonathan Kos-Read
- Country of origin: China
- Original languages: Chinese; English (occasionally French, Japanese, Russian and Spanish)
- No. of seasons: 1
- No. of episodes: 29

Production
- Executive producers: Wang Guohui; Yuan Mei
- Producers: Zhu Tong; Xue Guizhi; Wang Wei
- Cinematography: Wu Fei
- Editor: Wang Yue
- Running time: 43 minutes
- Production companies: Beijing Qixinran Film and Television Culture
- Budget: CN¥16,000,000

Original release
- Network: CCTV-8
- Release: 30 August 2006

Princess Der Ling (traditional Chinese: 德齡公主; simplified Chinese: 德龄公主; pinyin: Délíng Gōngzhǔ), also known as Secret Files of the Qing Imperial Palace: Princess Der Ling (清宮秘檔之德齡公主; 清宫秘档之德龄公主; Qīnggōng Mìdàng zhī Délíng Gōngzhǔ), is a Chinese period drama television series based on the historical novel of the same name written by Xu Xiaobin. The series premiered on CCTV-8 on 30 August 2006, and had been broadcast on Top TV in Taiwan since 2009, with Taiwanese Hokkien dubbing. It is the first and only television dramatisation of Der Ling's life.

== Synopsis ==
Upon their return to China from France, Der Ling (Zhang Jingjing) and Roung Ling (Sun Yifei), daughters of the Qing-dynasty diplomat Yu Keng (Liu Wenzhi), are installed as court ladies to the Empress Dowager Cixi (Lü Zhong). The Yu sisters, with the feeling of reforming an ancient empire, eventually realise its impossibility of change, and witness the dynasty's gradual demise. Der Ling's relationship with Kevin White (Jonathan Kos-Read; based on her real-life husband Thaddeus Cohu White) was highly romanticised in the series.

According to the Peking University professor Chen Xiaoming, in Xu Xiaobin's novel, as well in the series adaptation, "Der Ling and Roung Ling are symbols of Western civilisation". Despite being born in the Qing Empire, "they are the messengers of modern Western civilisation rather than daughters of ancient Eastern civilisation. They enter the ancient palace carrying within themselves a modern concept, a modern lifestyle and a modern aesthetic, bringing a free spirit to a society of rigid stratification, which is fresh and more humane."

== Cast and characters ==
- Zhang Jingjing as Princess Der Ling
- Sun Yifei as Nellie Yu Roung Ling
- Lü Zhong as Empress Dowager Cixi
- Jonathan Kos-Read as Kevin White
- Pam as Amy White
- Sylvia as Katharine Carl
- Xu Jian as John Yu Shuinling
- Liu Wenzhi as Yu Keng
- Huang Meiying as Lady Yu Keng (Louisa Pierson)
- Huang He as Guangxu Emperor
- Yan Zi as Empress consort of Guangxu
- Wang Zi as Consort Jin
- Wu Liping as Li Lianying
- Zhou Yinghong as the Fourth Princess
- Zhang Yajun as Princess Rongshou
- Han Xinmin as Ronglu
- Sun Ning as Wu Tingfang
- Lu Chang'en as Sun Yu
- Sha Jingchang as Yuan Shikai
- Jia Dazhong as Zhang Zhidong
- Zou Zheng as Xiaowenzi
- Wang Wentao as Xiaoshizi
- Zhang Ge as Musashi
- Ken'ichi Miura as Uchida Kōsai
- Yuka Ishizaki as wife of Uchida Kōsai (Uchida Masako)
- Peter as Edwin H. Conger
- Maresa as wife of Edwin H. Conger (Sarah J. Conger)
- Galia as wife of Georgy Planson
- Xing Jun as Consort Yu
- Wang Shuai as Barong

== DVD release ==
The series was released in a DVD boxset on 7 September 2006. The set includes ten discs containing all the episodes.
