= Arthur J. Burks =

American novelist and pulp-fiction author (1898–1974)

Arthur Josephus Burks
- Born: September 13, 1898; Waterville, Washington, United States
- Died: May 13, 1974 (aged 75); Paradise, Pennsylvania, United States
- Occupations: Writer, military officer
- Writing career
- Period: 1920–1974
- Genres: fantasy, horror, detective, adventure, science fiction, weird menace, aviation

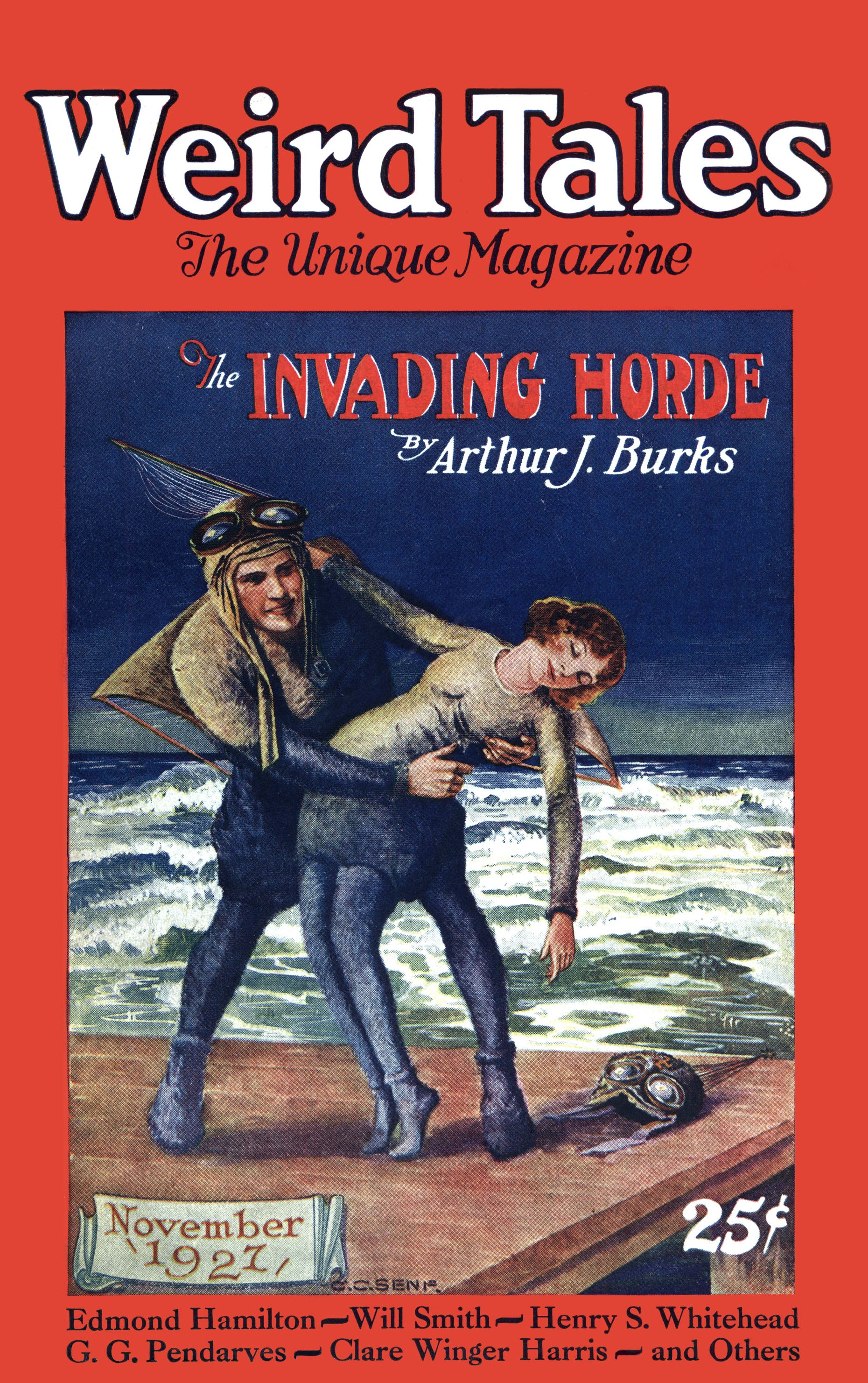
Burks's novelette "The Invading Horde" was the cover story in the November 1927 Weird Tales.

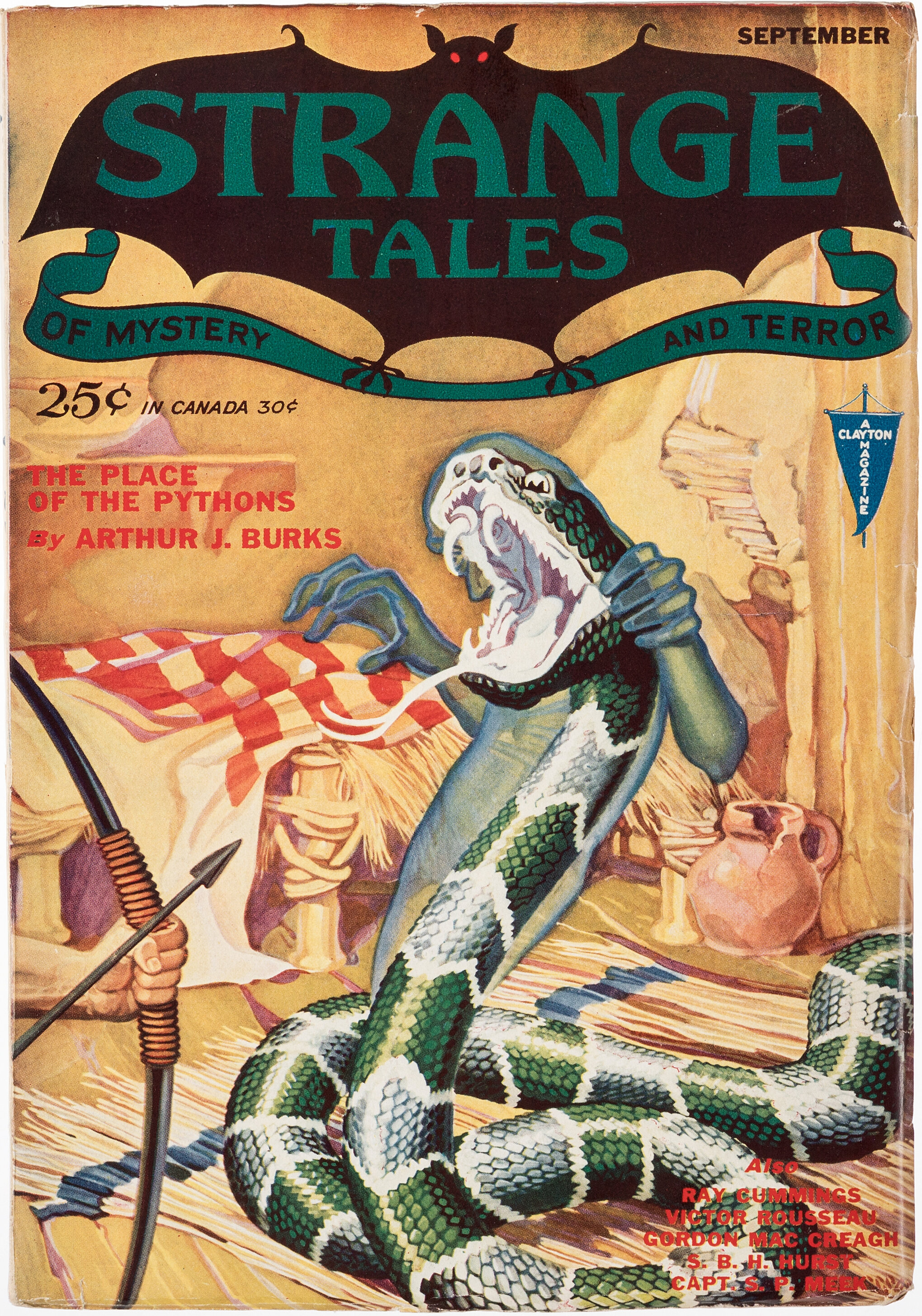
Burks's "The Place of the Pythons" was the cover story in the debut issue of Strange Tales in 1931.

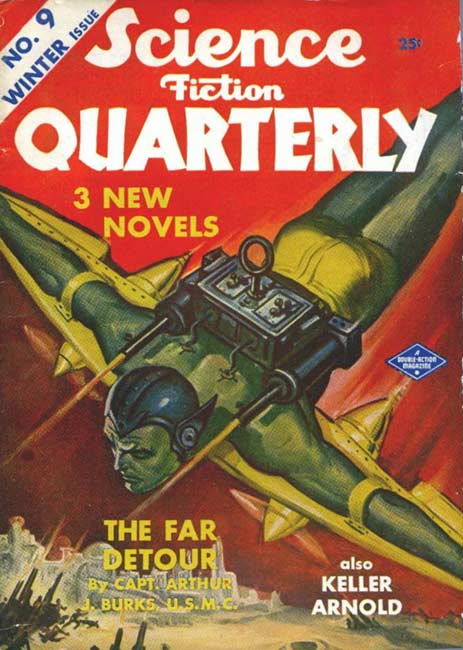
Burks's novella "The Far Detour" was cover-featured on the Winter 1942 issue of Science Fiction Quarterly.

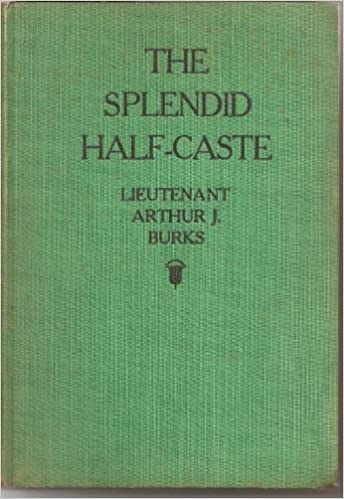
First edition, The Splendid Half-Caste.

Arthur J. Burks (1898–1974) was an American Marine officer and author. He wrote a large quantity of fiction for American pulp magazines. He published a number of books under his own name and ghostwrote books and magazine articles for others. He co-founded the American Fiction Guild in 1932 and served three terms as president.

== Life ==
Burks was born to a farming family in Waterville, Washington. He married Blanche Fidelia Lane on March 23, 1918, in Sacramento, California, and was the father of four children: Phillip Charles, Wasle Carmen, Arline Mary, and Gladys Lura. He served with the United States Marine Corps in World War I, and began writing in 1920. After being stationed in the Dominican Republic and inspired by the native voodoo rituals he'd learned about from Haitian prisoners in a military jail, Burks began to write stories of the supernatural that he sold to the magazine Weird Tales in 1924.

In late 1927, he resigned from the Marine Corps and began writing full-time. He became one of the "million-word-a-year" men in the pulp magazines by virtue of his tremendous output. He wrote approximately 800 stories for pulp magazines. He was known for being able to use any household object that someone would suggest to generate the plot of a story. His byline was commonplace on magazine covers. He wrote primarily in the genres of aviation, detective, adventure, science fiction, sports (primarily boxing), and weird menace. Two genres he was not to be found in were love and westerns. He wrote several series, including the Kid Friel boxing stories for the magazine Gangster Stories, and the Dorus Noel undercover-detective stories for All Detective Magazine, set in Manhattan's Chinatown.

In 1932, Burks and author George Bruce established the American Fiction Guild, a quasi-union for pulp writers. Burks served as president for three of the first four terms (1932–33, 1933–34, 1935–36).

While producing fiction for the pulps, Burks wrote fiction and nonfiction for hardbound publication. In 1938, he launched two book publishing imprints, Sovereign House and the Egmont Press; both produced multiple titles but neither imprint was successful. His novel The Great Amen was published by Egmont. Burks also had a sporadic and occasionally lucrative career as a ghostwriter; his first ghosted book was Old Buddha by Princess Der Ling (New York: Dodd, Mead and Company, 1928). He eventually wrote seven books for Der Ling.

In 1929, Burks, Der Ling, and fellow writer Robert A. McLean concocted a newspaper hoax that described the fictional Golondrina Island, an island that was added to maps, events described in The Princess, the Speed-King, and the Sultan of Llang-Llang: How Three Writers Pulled Off the Wildest Hoax of the Jazz Age, by John Locke (2026).

His productivity decreased during the late-1930s. He resumed active military duty as the U.S. joined World War II and eventually retired with the rank of lieutenant colonel. Burks relocated to Paradise in Lancaster County, Pennsylvania, in 1948, where he continued to write until his death in 1974. Throughout the 1960s, he wrote many works on metaphysics and the paranormal. During his later years, he lectured on paranormal activities and gave psychic readings.

== Critical appraisal ==
Horror grandmaster H. P. Lovecraft described "Bells of Oceana" as one of the half-dozen Weird Tales stories to achieve "the greatest amount of truly cosmic horror and macabre convincingness."

E. F. Bleiler described Burks' novel The Great Mirror (1952) as "pretty bad". He stated of the collection Look Behind You (1954), "In terms of content and format this is one of the low points in American fan publishing." Bleiler described Burks's collection Black Medicine (1966) as "a weak collection. The Caribbean stories show racial bias to the point of grotesqueness, and most of the other stories are routine pulp fiction. ["Three Coffins"] has points of interest, and ["Bells of Oceana"] is worth reading for a certain baroque, exuberant overkill of horror."

== Bibliography ==
=== Selected short stories ===
- "The Invading Horde", Weird Tales (November 1927)
- "Monsters of Moyen", Astounding Stories (April 1930)
- "The Place of the Pythons", Strange Tales (September 1931)
- "Guatemozin the Visitant", Strange Tales (November 1931)
- "The Room of Shadows", Weird Tales (May 1936)
- "The Discarded Veil" (1937)
- "The Golden Horseshoe", (1937)
- "Hell Ship", Astounding Stories (August 1938)
- "Survival", Marvel Science Stories (August 1938): Americans move underground to escape Mongol hordes
- "Exodus", Marvel Science (November 1938) [sequel to "Survival"]
- "West Point of Tomorrow", Thrilling Wonder Stories (September 1940)
- "The Far Detour", Science Fiction Quarterly (Winter 1942)
- "Black Harvest of Moraine", Weird Tales (January 1950)

=== Books ===
- Dominican Republic Handbook (U.S. Marine Corps, 1923)
- The Splendid Half-Caste (1925) (first novel)
- Walter Garvin in Mexico (1927) (with Brigadier-General Smedley D. Butler)
- Rivers Into Wilderness (1932) (under penname Burke MacArthur)
- Land of Checkerboard Families (1932)
- Here Are My People (1934) (family history)
- The Great Amen (NY: Egmont Press, 1938)
- Who Do You Think You Are? (1939) (a metaphysical treatise)
- Bells Above the Amazon, the Life of Hugo Mense Adventurer of the Spirit (1951)
- The Great Mirror (1952)
- Look Behind You (Tales of Science, Fantasy, and the Macabre) (1954) (collects 6 stories)
- Sex the Divine Flame (1961)
- Human Structural Dynamics (1964)
- Black Medicine (1966) (Arkham House)
- En-Don: The Ageless Wisdom (1973)
- The Crimson Blight (2005) Black Dog Books
- Grottos of Chinatown: The Dorus Noel Stories (2009) (Off-Trail Publications)
- PULP TALES PRESENTS #14: THE CRIMSON BLIGHT and Other Stories (2009) Pulpville Press
- The Osilians (2012) Pulpville Press
- Earth, The Marauder (2012) Pulpville Press
- Man-Ape: Two Tales from the Pulps (2012) Wildside Press
- Cathedral of Horror and Other Stories: The Weird Tales of Arthur J. Burks: Volume #1 (2014) (Ramble House)
- Masters of the Weird Tale: Arthur J. Burks (2018) (Centipede Press)
- The Black Falcon (2021) Age of Aces
- Masters of Horror, vol 4: Arthur J. Burks—Wizard of Weird Tales (2022) Armchair Fiction/Sinister Cinema.

== Ghostwritten works ==
=== Books ===
- Old Buddha, by Princess Der Ling (NY: Dodd, Mead and Company, 1928). Burks wrote (and signed) the preface.
- Kowtow, by Princess Der Ling (NY: Dodd, Mead, 1929)
- Lotos Petals, by Princess Der Ling (NY: Dodd, Mead, 1930)
- Jades and Dragons, by Princess Der Ling (NY: The Mohawk Press, 1932)
- Golden Phoenix, by Princess Der Ling (NY: Dodd, Mead, 1932)
- Imperial Incense, by Princess Der Ling (NY: Dodd, Mead, 1934)
- Yankee Komisar, by Commander Sergius Martin Riis (NY: Robert Speller, Inc., 1935)
- Son of Heaven, by Princess Der Ling (NY: D. Appleton-Century Company, 1935)
- Trujillo: The Man and His Country, by Sander Ariza (NY: Orlin Tremaine Co., Publishers, 1939)
- Children at the Window, by Marion Funk Smith (Buffalo: Pegasus Publications, 1953)
- Teaching the Slow-Learning Child, by Marion Funk Smith (NY: Harper & Brothers, 1954)
- The Great Rascal, by Estelle Cothran Latta (St. Louis: State Publishing Co., 1955)
- Chicken and the Egg, by William H. Wilson (NY: Coward-McCann, 1955)

=== Articles ===
- "The Forbidden City and Broadway", by Princess Der Ling, The Saturday Evening Post, September 14, 1929.
- "How China Went Air Minded", by Princess Der Ling, Flyers, November 1929.
- "Wings for Women", by Princess Der Ling, Flyers, December 1929.
- "Within the Golden City", by Princess Der Ling, The Saturday Evening Post, December 21, 1929.
- "Beyond All Riches", by Mrs. Thaddeus C. White (Princess Der Ling), Good Housekeeping, August 1931.
- "The Kingdom of Swallows", by Princess Der Ling, Good Housekeeping, February 1935.

=== Short stories ===
- "The White Fox", by Princess Der Ling, McCall's Magazine, April 1929.
- "Vultures of Julai", by Princess Der Ling, Flyers, February 1930.
- "Looters of Ta Kuei", by Princess Der Ling, Air Action, April 1939.

== See also ==
- Princess Der Ling
- The Sultan of Llang-Llang

== Sources ==
- Jones, Robert Kenneth (1975). The Shudder Pulps. Oregon: FAX Collectors Editions.
- Locke, John (2004). Pulp Fictioneers: Adventures in the Storytelling Business. Adventure House. ISBN 978-1-886937-83-3.
- Locke, John (2007). Pulpwood Days: Volume 1: Editors You Want to Know. Off-Trail Publications. ISBN 978-0-9786836-2-7.
- Locke, John (2018). The Thing's Incredible! The Secret Origins of Weird Tales. Off-Trail Publications. pp. 181–195. ISBN 978-1-935031-25-3.
- Locke, John (2026). The Princess, the Speed-King, and the Sultan of Llang-Llang: How Three Writers Pulled Off the Wildest Hoax of the Jazz Age. Off-Trail Publications. ISBN 978-1-935031-27-7.
- Renda, Mary (2001). Taking Haiti: Military Occupation and the Culture of U.S. Imperialism. University of North Carolina Press. pp. 173–178. ISBN 0-8078-4938-3.
- Ruber, Peter (2000). Arkham's Masters of Horror. Sauk City, WI: Arkham House. pp. 249–253. ISBN 0-87054-177-3.
- Tuck, Donald H. (1974). The Encyclopedia of Science Fiction and Fantasy. Chicago: Advent. pp. 77–78. ISBN 0-911682-20-1.
