= Empire of Silver (film) =

2009 Taiwanese-Hong Kong-Chinese film by Christina Yao

- Theatrical release poster
- Directed by: Christina Yao
- Written by: Christina Yao
- Based on: The Silver Valley by Cheng Yi
- Produced by: Jeremy Thomas; Chiao Hsiung Ping; Christina Yao
- Starring: Aaron Kwok; Zhang Tielin; Hao Lei; Jennifer Tilly
- Cinematography: Anthony Pun
- Edited by: Humphrey Dixon; Liao Ching-sung; Tang Hua
- Music by: Su Cong; Seikou Ngaoka; Lin Hai
- Distributed by: Edko Films
- Release dates: 31 July 2009 (Taiwan); 21 August 2009 (China); 28 January 2010 (Hong Kong)
- Running time: 113 minutes
- Countries: Taiwan; Hong Kong; China
- Language: Mandarin

Empire of Silver (simplified Chinese: 白银帝国; traditional Chinese: 白銀帝國; pinyin: Báiyín Dìguó; Jyutping: Baak6 Ngan4 Dai3 Gwok3) is a 2009 historical epic film written and directed by Christina Yao, based on the novel The Silver Valley by Cheng Yi. It focuses on a wealthy banking clan in Pingyao, Shanxi and its fortunes during the turn-of-the-century Chinese economic and political turmoil. The film stars Aaron Kwok and Jennifer Tilly.

== Cast ==
- Aaron Kwok as Third Master
- Zhang Tielin as Lord Kang
- Hao Lei as Madame Kang
- Jennifer Tilly as Mrs. Landdeck
- Jonathan Kos-Read as Pastor Landdeck
- Lei Zhenyu as Manager Dai
- Ding Zhicheng as Qiu Taiji
- John Paisley as Dr. Wilson
- Chin Shih-chieh as Manager Liu
- Tien Niu as Yu Feng
- Hou Tongjiang as Chief Manager Sun
- Shi Xiaoman as Lao Xia
- Shi Dasheng as First Master
- Hei Zi as Second Master
- Wang Deshun as Chang You
- Chang Lan-tian as Eunuch
- Lü Zhong as Lu Sao
- Li Yixiao as Fourth wife
- Du Jiang as Fourth Master
- Guo Tao as Bandit chief
- Xu Zhengyun as Manager Zhou
- Wu Fang as San Xi
- Wang Shuang as Third Wife
- Mou Ruiying as Second wife
- Chi Guodong as Qing official
- Dennis Chan as Governor
- Chen Jun as Escort A
- Xia Le as Escort B
- Liu Zhongyuan as Fifth Master (narrator)
- Chai Jin
- Sing Ning
