= Arthur M. Sackler Gallery =

Museum of Asian art in Washington, D.C.

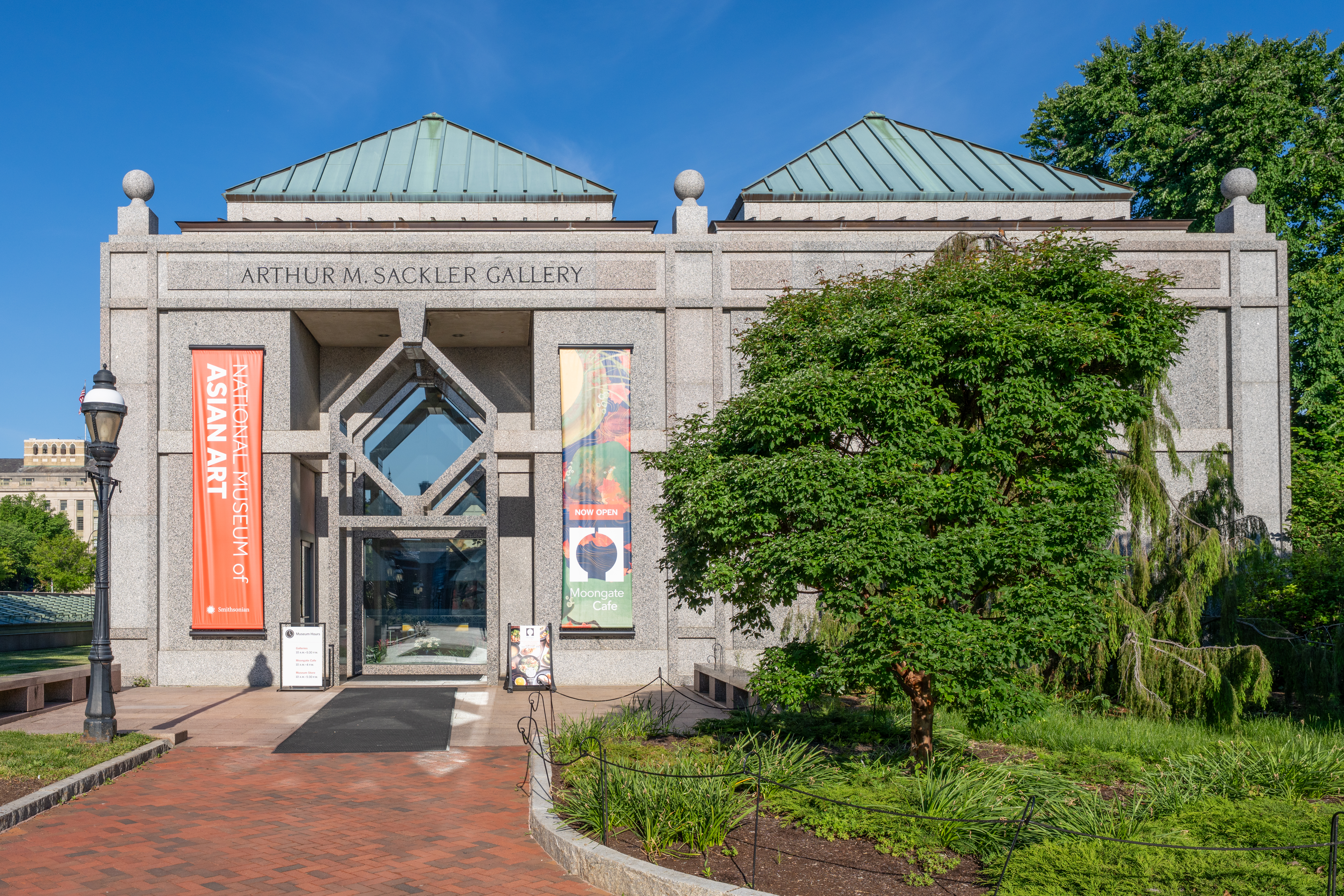
- Established: 1987
- Location: 1050 Independence Ave SW, Washington, D.C., DC 20560, U.S.
- Coordinates: 38.88796°N 77.02644°W
- Director: Chase F. Robinson
- Public transit access: Smithsonian
- Website: www.asia.si.edu

The Arthur M. Sackler Gallery is an art museum of the Smithsonian Institution in Washington, D.C., focusing on Asian art. The Sackler Gallery and the Freer Gallery of Art together form the National Museum of Asian Art in the United States. The Freer and Sackler galleries house the largest Asian art research library in the country.

Founded in 1982, the Gallery is named after Arthur M. Sackler, who donated approximately 1,000 objects and $4 million to the building of the museum. Located on the south side of the National Mall, and being physically connected to the Freer Gallery of Art, 96% of the museum is located underground below the Enid A. Haupt Garden.

In 2018, the gallery was the target of protesters accusing the Sackler family of being a key contributor to the opioid epidemic in the United States.

== History ==
Japanese Prime Minister Masayoshi Ōhira visited the Freer Gallery of Art in 1979. During his visit, he announced that Japan would donate $1 million to the Smithsonian in order to assist in the building of an annex to the Freer to display Asian art. That same year, the United States Senate approved the Smithsonian Institution's request for $500,000 to build museums for Asian and African art on June 6. In June, 1980, the Smithsonian removed the South Quadrangle Project from their fiscal plan. The project resurfaced in 1981, and on December 23 Congress approved $960,000 for the new complex. It was the first time that federal funds were contributed to a project as unrestricted.

In 1982, Arthur M. Sackler donated around 1,000 Asian artworks and objects to the Smithsonian Institution. The collection was valued at $50 million. Along with the object donation, Sackler also provided $4 million to build a facility to house the objects, thus founding the Arthur M. Sackler Gallery. The quadrangle construction began on June 22, 1982. An additional $36.5 million of federal money was appropriated to continue the project in October. Groundbreaking took place on June 21, 1983, with participation by Chief Justice Warren E. Burger, then Vice President George H. W. Bush and Smithsonian Secretary S. Dillon Ripley. On February 21, 1984, Milo C. Beach was declared scholarly director of the Sackler Gallery.

The gallery opened on September 28, 1987. Arthur Sackler died four months before the opening. In honor of the quadrangle complex's opening, Washington, D.C. Mayor Marion Barry declared the day "Smithsonian Institution Day." Starting in October, Milo C. Beach served as acting director of both the Sackler and the Freer. In November 1988, he became director of both.

In March 2002, scholar in Islamic art Julian Raby was appointed director of the combined galleries. In 2006, J. Keith Wilson became the assistant director and curator of Chinese art.

In January, 2012, the Sackler celebrated the 30th anniversary of its founding with a gift of $5 million from Sackler's widow.

== Architecture ==
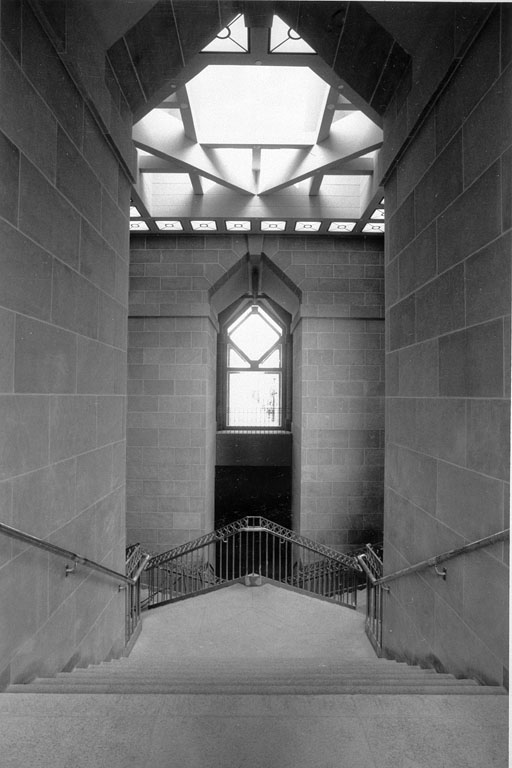
The grand staircase at the Sackler.

The Gallery is located in the Quadrangle Complex behind the Smithsonian Institution Castle. It shares the complex with the National Museum of African Art and the S. Dillon Ripley Center. The complex, which is 96% underground and covers 115,000 square feet (10,700 m^{2}), was designed by Jean Paul Carlhian, with the goal of connecting various underground buildings. Geometric forms, influenced by the Smithsonian Castle, the Arts and Industries Building and the Freer Gallery of Art, were used in the design, as was pink and gray granite representative of the color of those buildings. The Sackler Gallery is next to the Freer Gallery of Art. It is decorated with designs inspired by Islamic art. A 4,130-square-foot (384 m^{2}) granite pavilion was built in the Enid A. Haupt Victorian Garden to serve as an entrance to the facility. A fountain, shaped like a diamond, is located on the third and lowest floor, which can be viewed from the two upper levels. Construction of a tunnel between the Freer and Sackler was begun in early 1987 and completed in 1989. The sections of the Gallery open to the public cover 40,905 square feet (3,800.2 m^{2}).

== Gallery ==
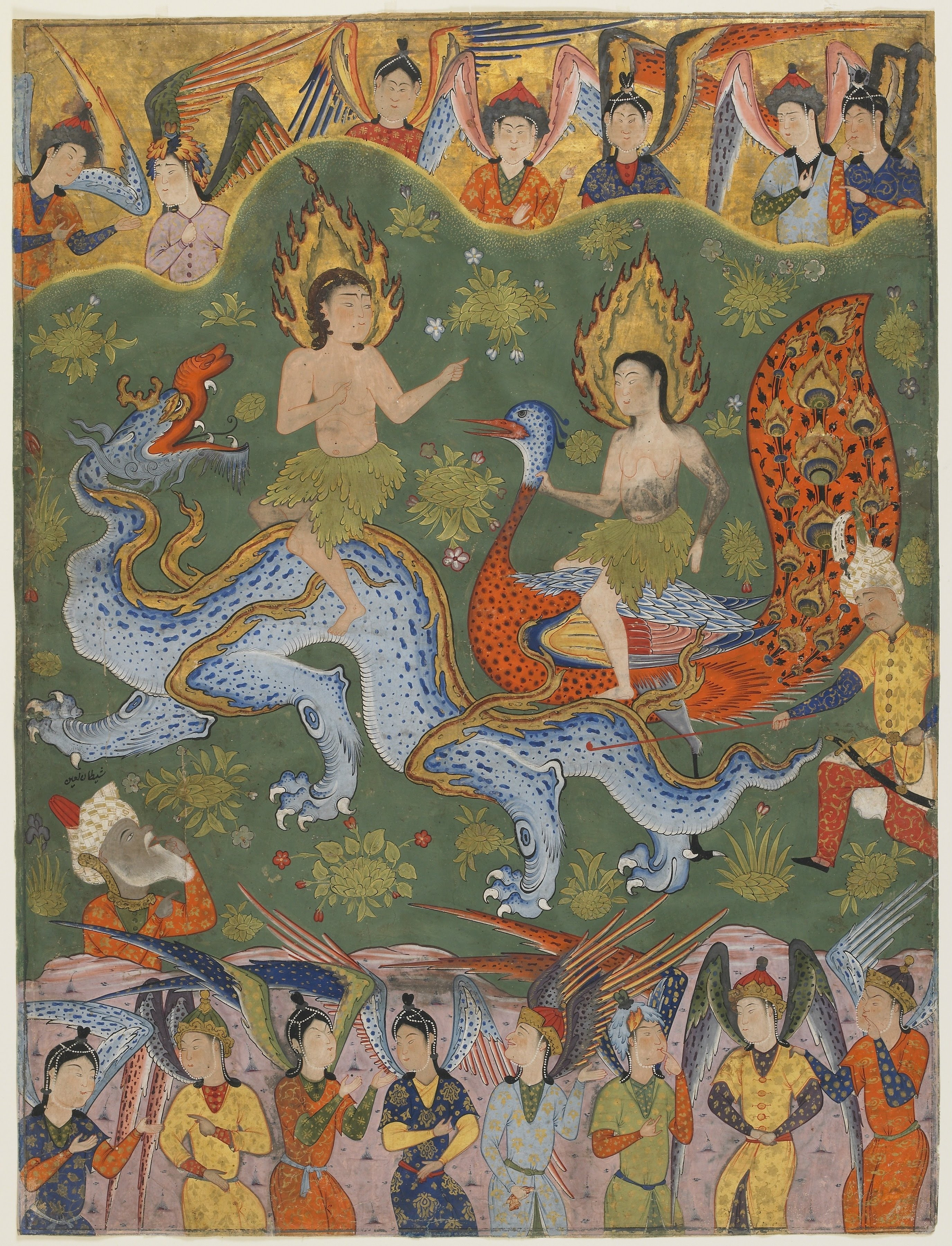
Adam and Eve

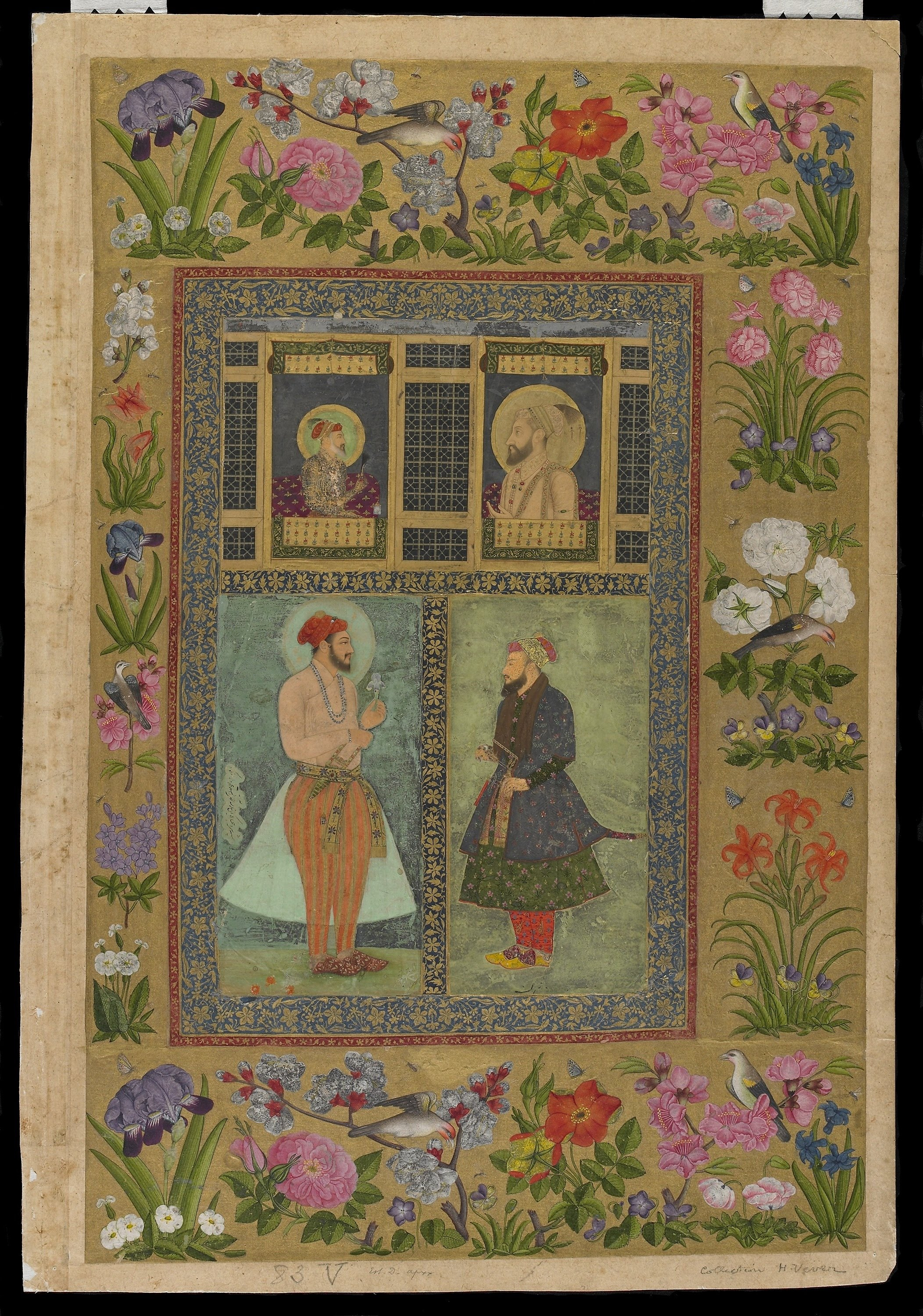
Four portraits

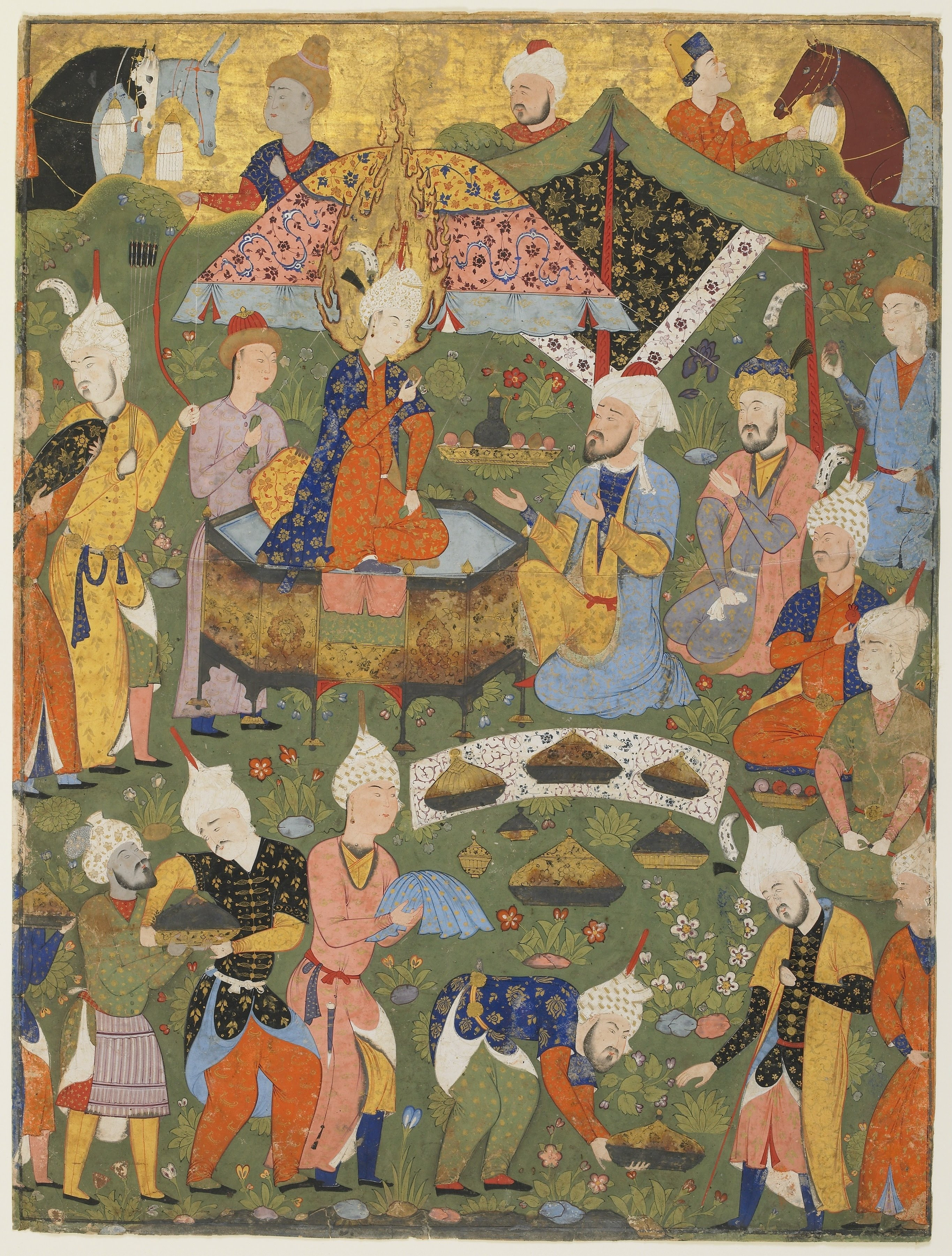
Joseph Enthroned from a Falnama

== Exhibitions ==
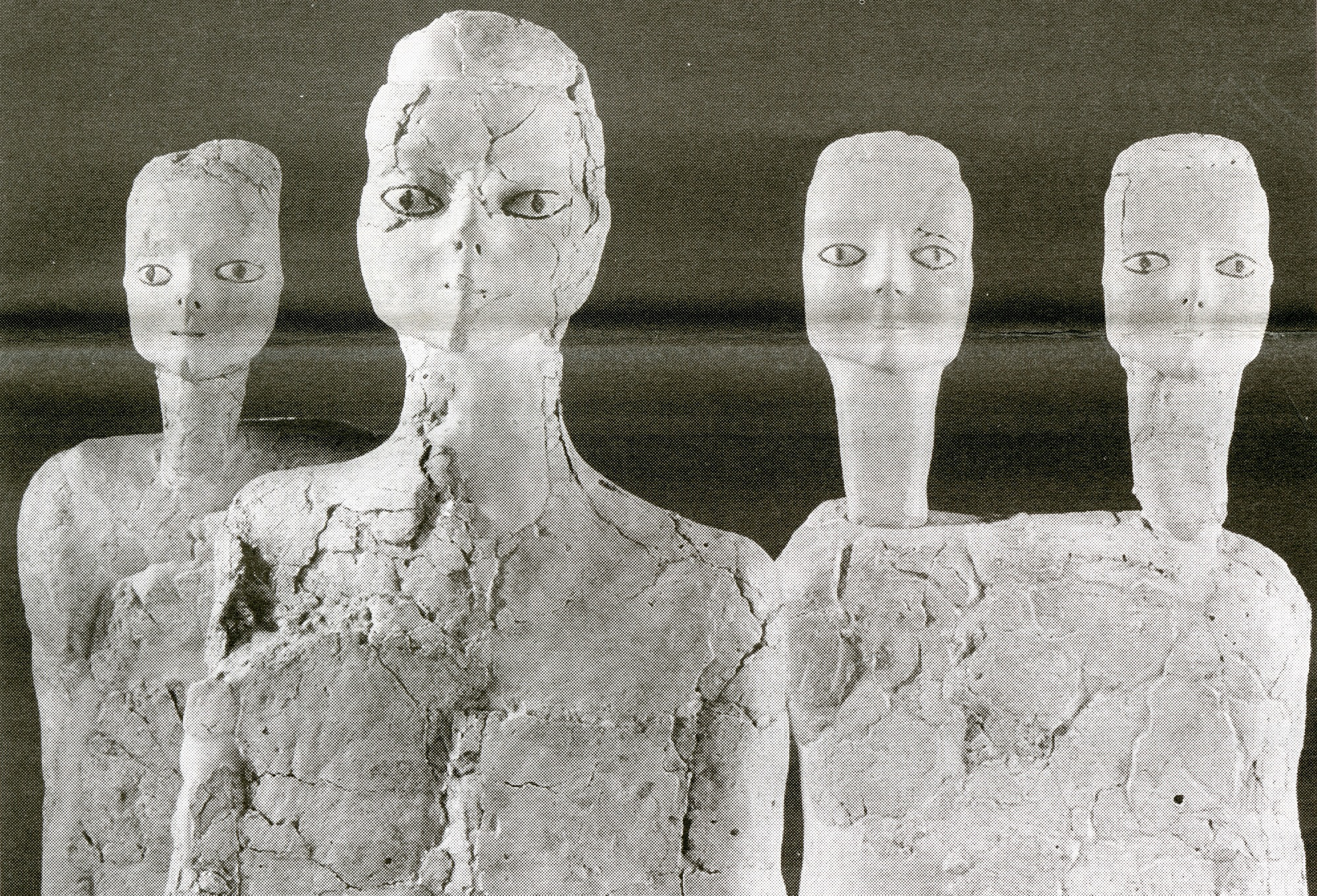
Ancient sculptures from Jordan

Exhibitions at the Gallery focus around Asian art and culture. In 1992, two exhibitions opened showcasing loaned and permanent collection objects: "Metalwork and Ceramics from Ancient Iran" and "Buddhist and Jain Sculpture from South Asia." Both exhibitions followed renovations. The following year, "Contemporary Porcelain from Japan," showcased 30 works by 30 Japanese artists, donated by the Japan Foundation. The first exhibition on Korean art took place in 1994, "Korean Arts of the Eighteenth Century: Splendor and Simplicity." An exhibition about scholarly research and provenance called "A Mughal Hunt" was held in 1994. It showcased the research behind newly acquired Mughal Empire paintings. That same year, "A Basketmaker of Rural Japan," was held. The exhibition showcased the work of Hiroshima Kazou and included works primarily on loan from the National Museum of Natural History.

In 1996, the Sackler hosted the oldest sculptures to be found in Western Asia. The sculptures, found in 1974 outside of Amman, Jordan, were sent to Washington, D.C., for research and conservation. The exhibition, "Preserving Ancient Statues From Jordan," exhibited eight pieces dating from 6500 to 7000 B.C. "King of the World: A Mughal Manuscript from the Royal Library, Windsor Castle", in 1997, exhibited the "Padshahnama" Mughal manuscript owned by the British Royal Family.

The Shahnama was on display in early 2011 in an exhibition curated by Islamic curator Massumeh Farhad, titled "Shahnama: 1000 Years of the Persian Book of Kings." Photography was the focus of a fall 2011 exhibition focusing on a collection of photographs of Empress Dowager Cixi, taken by a diplomat's son, Yu Xunling. The photographs were acquired by the Smithsonian after Xunling's sister, Der Ling died in 1944 and a dealer sold the collection of 36 photographic plates. The Sackler exhibited only six objects in its December, 2011 exhibition "Ancient Iranian Ceramics." The exhibit showcased pieces that are some 3,000 years old.

In 2011, the Sackler indefinitely postponed an exhibition of artifacts from the Belitung shipwreck owing to possible collecting violations by the commercial organization which acquired the objects. The exhibition was originally planned by the government of Singapore, which bought the objects for $32 million from a treasure hunting company.

The Gallery has also curated and hosted exhibitions about the Mesopotamian art collection of the Louvre, the paintings of Chang Dai-chien, and photographs of orientalism and colonialism in India. Contemporary artists exhibited have included Hai Bo and Ai Weiwei.

The Gallery also has a number rotating/temporary exhibits, which include:

- Yoga: The Art of Transformation (ending January 26, 2014)
- Chigusa and the Art of Tea (opening February 22, 2014)
- Kiyochika: Master of the Night, an exhibition showcasing Japanese artist Kobayashi Kiyochika (opening March 29, 2014)
- An American in London: Whistler and the Thames, an exhibition showcasing the work of American artist James McNeill Whistler (opening May 3, 2014)

A full list of all past, current, and future exhibitions can be found on the Freer|Sackler exhibitions page.

=== Collections ===
Aside from Sackler's original donation of objects, the Gallery also holds other collections. General holdings at the Gallery include Chinese, Indian, Korean and Japanese paintings, photography, contemporary ceramics from China, 19th- and 20th-century Japanese prints, contemporary Japanese pottery, and other related Asian arts.

==== Sackler Collection ====
The founding collection, consisting of approximately 1,000 objects, was donated by gallery namesake, Arthur M. Sackler in 1987. The Sackler collection consists of ancient and contemporary pieces, ranging from Near Eastern metalware and ceramics, South and Southeast Asian sculpture, Chinese jade and bronze pieces, and Chinese lacquerware and paintings.

==== Vever Collection ====
In 1986 the Sackler acquired the Vever Collection, a collection of Persian and Islamic paintings and manuscripts collected by jeweler Henri Vever. Collected between 1900 and 1943, the Vever Collection features one of the finest groupings of Persian books. Upon acquisition, Glenn Lowry and Milo Beach were the first scholars in forty years to see the objects.

== Conservation ==
The Department of Conservation and Scientific Research for both the Freer and Sackler Galleries was established as the first Smithsonian facility devoted to the use of scientific methods for the study of works of art and remains one of the few facilities in the United States that specializes in the conservation of Asian paintings.

Care of the collections began before the museums came into existence as Charles Lang Freer, the founder of the Freer Gallery of Art, hired Japanese painting restorers to care for his works and to prepare them for their eventual home as part of the Smithsonian Institution. In 1932, the Freer Gallery of Art hired a full-time Japanese restorer and established the East Asian Painting Conservation Studio. The Technical Laboratory, and the first use of scientific methods for the study of art at the Smithsonian Institution, started in 1951 when the chemist Rutherford J. Gettens moved from the Fogg Museum at Harvard University to the Freer. The East Asian Painting Conservation Studio and the Technical Laboratory merged in 1990 to form the Department of Conservation and Scientific Research.

Among the conservation projects that the Sackler Gallery has undertaken was a 2009 project where conservators used laser ablation inductively coupled plasma mass spectrometry at the Lawrence Berkeley National Laboratory to explore the "fingerprints" of ancient Chinese gold objects from the Gallery.

=== Scholarship ===
The Sackler presents lectures and symposia to the public with the Freer has copublished the art historical journal Artibus Asiae with the Museum Rietberg in Zürich since 1991.

The Freer and Sackler, along with the Metropolitan Center for Far Eastern Art Studies in Kyoto, Japan, presents the Shimada Prize for distinguished scholarship in the history of East Asian art. The award was established in 1992 in honor of Professor Shimada Shujiro, by the Freer Gallery of Art and Arthur M. Sackler Gallery and by The Metropolitan Center for Far Eastern Art Studies in Kyoto, Japan. In addition, the Sackler is able to exchange objects with other institutions (which the adjacent Freer Gallery of Art is prohibited from). Several fellowships are also available to support graduate students and visiting scholars, including the Andrew W. Mellon Fellowship, Anne Van Biema Fellowship (Japanese Visual Arts), Iran Heritage Foundation (IHF) Fellowship (Persian art), Lunder Fellowship, J. S. Lee Memorial Fellowship (Chinese Art), Smithsonian Institution Fellowship, and the Freer Fellowship.

=== Outreach ===
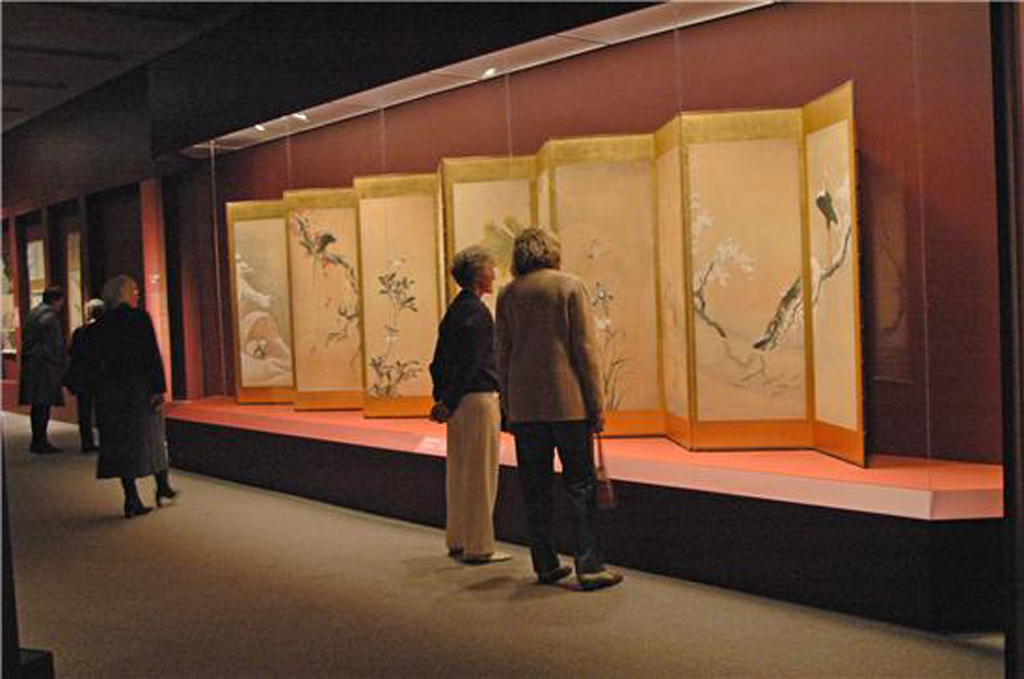
Exhibition at the Sackler, 2006

The Sackler has hosted a variety of celebrations and ongoing events revolving around Asian art and culture. In 1989, the Gallery hosted its first series of events, a two-month-long celebration of Persian art and culture sponsored in collaboration with the Foundation for Iranian Studies. Musician Dariush Dolat-shahi performed and workshops, lectures and other performances took place. Events often coincide with the theme of exhibitions. In 2011, Azar Nafisi and Dick Davis discussed the role of women in the Shahnameh in conjunction with an exhibition on the 1,000-year-old Persian poem.

=== Initiatives ===
Together, alongside the Freer and the Metropolitan Center for Far Eastern Studies of Kyoto, the Sackler created the Shimada Prize. The biannual $10,000 prize awards scholars of East Asian art. In 2011, the Sackler and the Freer received a major gift from donor Jahangir Amuzegar. The gift created two endowments, one for a yearly celebration of the Persian holiday of Nowruz and another to build a collection of and celebrate contemporary Iranian art. It was the largest Persian focused gift to be given to the Sackler and Freer and one of the largest Asian art donations ever given to the Smithsonian.

== Controversy over name ==
Beginning in 2018, the Arthur M. Sackler Gallery became the site of protests related to the Sackler family’s association with Purdue Pharma and the opioid epidemic in the United States, with demonstrators calling for the removal of the Sackler name from the museum. In December 2019, the Smithsonian Institution announced that the Freer Gallery of Art and the Arthur M. Sackler Gallery would operate under the shared institutional name National Museum of Asian Art, while retaining their individual gallery names. Reporting on the rebranding stated that donor agreements limited the Smithsonian’s ability to remove the Sackler name entirely, resulting in reduced prominence of the name in branding and public-facing materials rather than a formal renaming of the gallery.
