= John Yu Shuinling =

Multiracial court photographer of Chinese-American descent

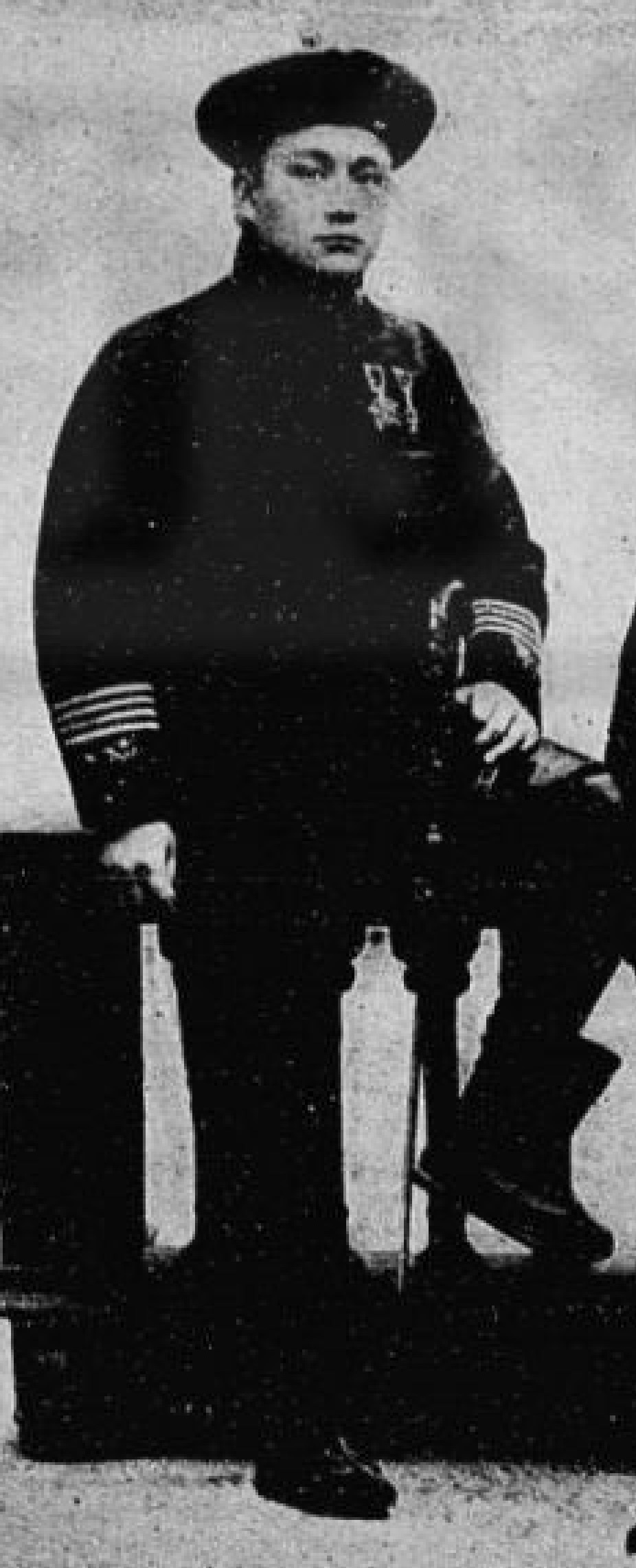
- John Shuinling in 1902
- Born: 1874
- Died: 1944 (aged 69–70)
- Occupations: Diplomat, engineer, photographer
- Parents: Yu Keng (father); Louisa Pierson (mother)
- Relatives: Charles Yu Hsingling (brother); Lizzie Yu Der Ling (sister); Nellie Yu Roung Ling (sister)

John Yu Shuinling (Chinese: 裕勛齡; pinyin: Yù Xūnlíng; Wade–Giles: Yü Hsün-ling; 1874 – 1944), often referred to as John Shuinling (also spelt Shung-Ling), was a Hanjun Plain White bannerman who served as second secretary in the Qing-dynasty Embassy in France. He was also an engineer and worked as director of the power station of Summer Palace, and a photographer notable for taking numerous photographs of the Empress Dowager Cixi.

== Biography ==
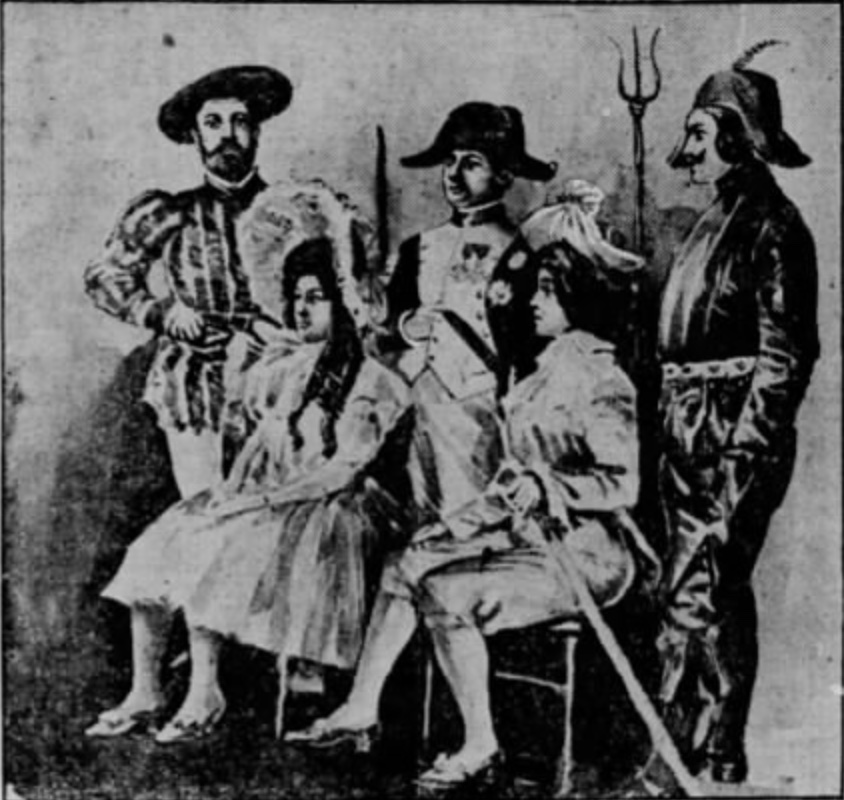
The Yu siblings at the fancy dress ball in 1901; from left: Commandant Armani as Francis I of France, Lizzie Yu Der Ling as a doll in the fairy tale, Charles Yu Hsingling as Napoleon, Nellie Yu Roung Ling as Prince Charming, and John Yu Shuinling as Pluto.

Born in an upper-class family, he was the elder son of Yu Keng, a high-ranking Qing official, and Louisa Pierson, a Chinese-American woman of mysterious antecedents. He had three siblings, one brother Charles Yu Hsingling, two younger sisters, Lizzie Yu Der Ling and Nellie Yu Roung Ling. They all received Western education in American missionary school. The British diplomat Sir Robert Hart described them as "a noisy family of English-speaking children, were fluent also in Japanese and French".^{:52}

From 1899 to 1902, he served as second secretary in the Qing-dynasty Embassy in France, where his father held a diplomatic post. The Yu siblings led a cosmopolitan life in Paris, they socialised, frequented the theatre and performed at their parents' parties. The weekly magazine Armée et Marine reported that the four children of Minister Yu Keng "superbly performed" an English comedy in three acts at a soirée organised by their father.

In March 1901, the Yus threw a fancy dress ball at the Chinese Embassy to celebrate Chinese New Year, at which Shuinling was costumed as Pluto, his siblings Hsingling, Roung Ling and Der Ling, were dressed respectively as Napoleon, Prince Charming and a doll in the fairy tale.

He became an amateur photographer during his stay in Paris. After the Yus' return to China, from 1903 to 1905, he took a large number of photographs of the Empress Dowager Cixi with a camera from Europe. More than half of the negatives are now held by the Arthur M. Sackler Gallery. One photo shows the Empress with Shuinling's daughter Lily, of which little information is known.

In 1936, he wrote an afterword for the Chinese translation of Der Ling's Imperial Incense, at the invitation of its translator Chin Shou-ou. Not much is known about his later life, he died in 1944.

== In popular culture ==
- In the 2006 television series Princess Der Ling, John Shuinling was played by Xu Jian.
