= Princess Der Ling =

Multiracial princess of Qing dynasty

Lizzie Yu Yü Derling Princess Derling Elisabeth Antoinette White
- Princess of the Third Rank
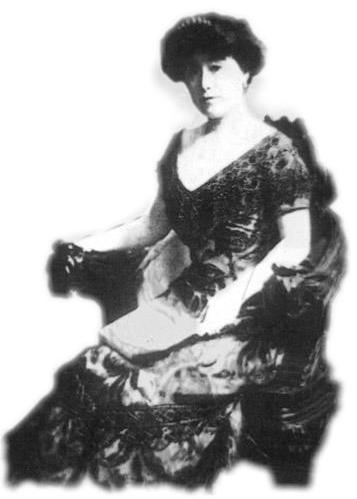
- Born: Yü Der Ling 裕德齡; 8 June 1881; Wuhan, Hubei, Qing China
- Died: 22 November 1944 (aged 63); Berkeley, California, U.S.
- Spouse: Thaddeus C. White
- Issue: 1
- Father: Yu Keng
- Mother: Louisa Pierson
- Religion: Roman Catholic

Lizzie Yu Der Ling (Chinese: 裕德齡; pinyin: Yù Délíng; Wade–Giles: Yü Tê-ling; 8 June 1881 – 22 November 1944), better known as "Princess" Der Ling, and also known as Elisabeth Antoinette White after her marriage to Thaddeus C. White, was the first lady-in-waiting for Empress Dowager Cixi.

Her father was the Chinese diplomat Yü Keng; and her mother was Louisa Pierson, who was herself the half-Chinese daughter of a Boston merchant working in Shanghai. Although not a member of the Qing royal family, Der Ling was given the title of "commandery princess" while serving as the lady-in-waiting for Empress Cixi. She was the ghostwritten author of a number of books and magazine articles with China themes.

== Early life ==
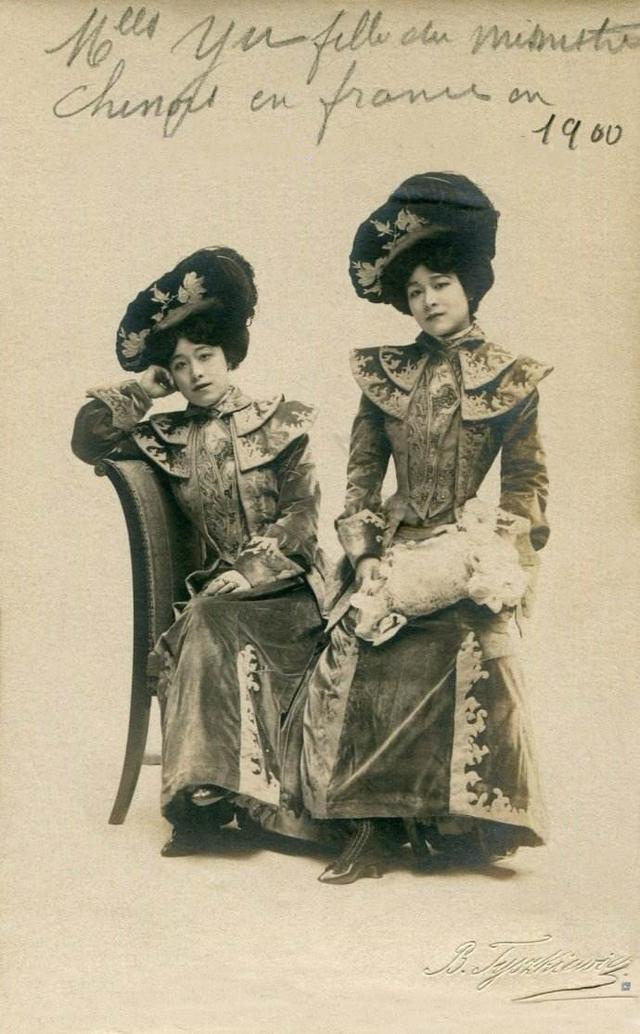
Der Ling (left) and her sister Roung Ling in 1900

Der Ling's father Yu Keng (Note: His ancestral surname was Hsü but was abandoned following Manchu customs since he was a member of Eight Banners. He later chose Yü, the first character of his given name as his surname.) was a member of the Hanjun Plain White Banner Corps, and according to his daughter, he was a Lord: this is of some doubt. After serving as Chinese minister to Japan, he was appointed minister to the French Third Republic for four years in 1899. He was known for his progressive, reformist views; for his determination to educate his children, including the girls, in western schools, which was highly unusual in their generation; and for his unvarying support of the Empress Dowager Cixi. In 1905, Yü Keng died in Shanghai.

According to Der Ling's biographer, Der Ling's mother, Louisa Pierson, was the daughter of a Boston-born American and a Chinese woman. However, in the book, whatever her background, she is repeatedly referred to by other people as a Manchu.

Yü Keng's daughters Der Ling and Roung Ling (1882–1973, the future Madame Dan Pao-tchao of Peking) received a western education, learning French and English, and studying dance in Paris with Isadora Duncan.

Der Ling was a Catholic, baptised by the French bishop Alphonse Favier. While a young girl, she traveled with her father to Rome and received papal blessing by the hand of Pope Leo XIII during a private meeting.

== Lady-in-waiting and later life ==
Upon their return to China, Der Ling became the first lady-in-waiting to the Empress Dowager Cixi, as well as interpreting for her when she received foreign visitors. Der Ling stayed at court until March 1905. In 1907, Der Ling married Thaddeus C. White, an American. Der Ling and Thaddeus had one child; a son named Thaddeus Raymond White, who died at 20 in 1933 due to pneumonia. Der Ling had a brother, John Yu Shuinling, who studied photography in France and later took the only photographs of Empress Dowager Cixi still in existence.

Using the title of Princess, which would create controversy for her in both China and the United States in the future, Der Ling wrote of her experiences in court in her memoir Two Years in the Forbidden City, which was published in 1911. She states in her book that the status of Princess, which the Empress Dowager had given her, was valid only within the palace. As the Guangxu Emperor, who was under a form of house arrest, never confirmed the title, it was not valid in the outside world.

Two Years in the Forbidden City provides unique insights into life at the Manchu court and the character of the Empress Dowager: an environment that ended abruptly with the 1911 Revolution that overthrew the Manchu or Qing dynasty. Der Ling continued to write and published seven more books.

Der Ling was not a member of the Qing royal family. Although Der Ling claimed to be an ethnic Manchu, her father Yü Keng was actually a Han Chinese Bannerman and not part of the ethnic Manchu Banners.^{:6} Her father was not royal but was a bannerman, just as Der Ling claimed she was a Manchu while she was actually a Chinese Bannerwoman.^{:17}

== Death ==
Der Ling died in a Berkeley, California hospital after being struck by a truck driver while crossing an intersection onto the University of California campus. She had been teaching Chinese to American military officers at Peking's College of China, which had been relocated to the Berkeley campus.

== Memoirs and writings ==
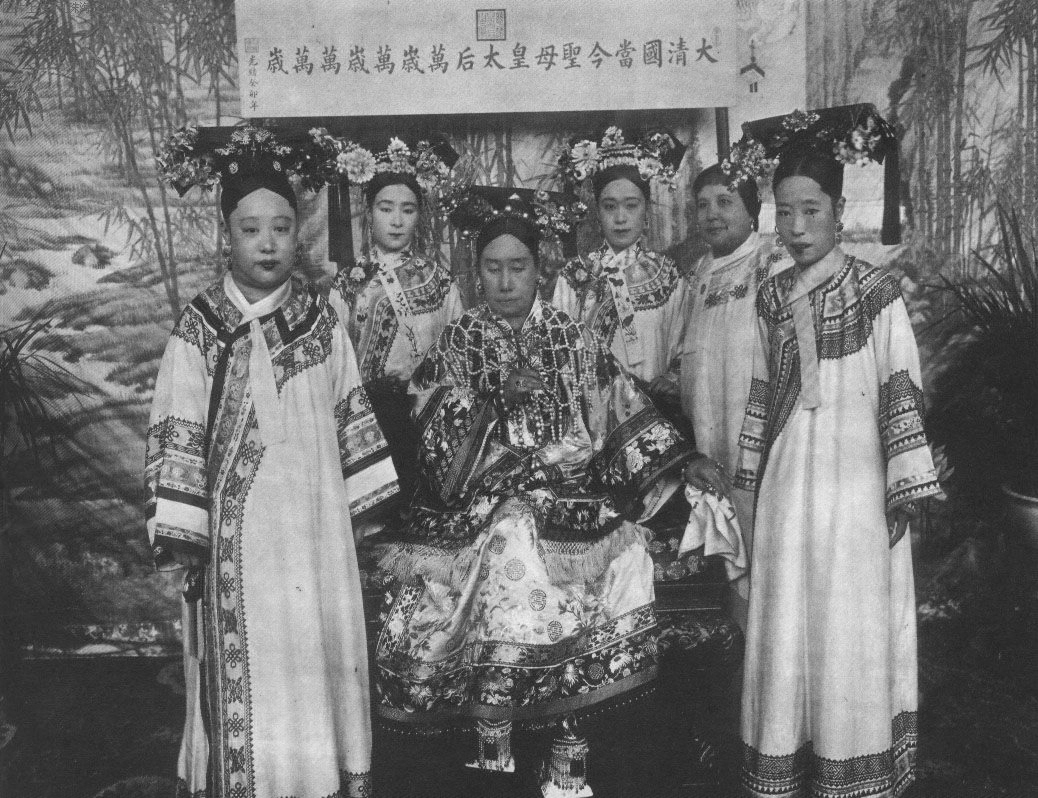
Princess Der Ling third from right with Cixi

After Cixi's death in 1908, Der Ling professed to be so angered by what she saw as false portraits of Cixi appearing in books and periodicals that she wrote her own account of serving "Old Buddha", which she called Two Years in the Forbidden City. This book appeared in 1911, just before the fall of the Qing dynasty, and was a popular success.

In this book, Cixi is not the monster of depravity depicted in the popular press and in the second- and third-hand accounts left by foreigners who had lived in Beijing, but an aging woman who loved beautiful things, had many regrets about the past and the way she had dealt with the many crises of her long reign, and apparently trusted Der Ling enough to share many memories and opinions with her.

Der Ling would go on to byline seven more books about this relatively brief period in her youth when she had been close to the heart of declining imperial Chinese power, and sharing this personal history and her habit of promoting herself and her writings caused most of her family to turn against her. All of this has made it difficult to assess Der Ling's contribution to late Qing historiography.

However, the fact remains that she was the first Chinese woman to live with Cixi and observe her, and then write about what that experience was like; if many of Der Ling's recollections smack of the every day minutiae of a court that thrived on details and form, her writings are no less valuable for focusing on them, particularly as life within the Forbidden City and the Summer Palace was a closed book for most people in China, let alone in the rest of the world. Her opinion was that it was misunderstanding of much of what emanated from the throne that created so many of the problems Cixi has been wholly blamed for.

Der Ling's last seven books (from Old Buddha to Son of Heaven), as well as magazine articles in The Saturday Evening Post, McCall's, pulp magazines, and other publications, were ghostwritten by her friend, pulp writer Arthur J. Burks. Der Ling and Burks met in Tientsin in 1927, while Burks was an officer in the United States Marine Corps.

In 1929, Burks, Der Ling, and fellow writer Robert A. McLean concocted a newspaper hoax that described the fictional Golondrina Island, an island that was added to real maps; those events were described in The Princess, the Speed-King, and the Sultan of Llang-Llang: How Three Writers Pulled Off the Wildest Hoax of the Jazz Age, by John Locke (2026).

== Published works ==
=== Books ===
- Two Years in the Forbidden City (1911)
- Old Buddha (1928), with preface by Arthur J. Burks
- Kowtow (1929)
- Lotus Petals (1930)
- Jades and Dragons (1932)
- Golden Phoenix (1932)
- Imperial Incense (1933)
- Son of Heaven (1935)

=== Magazine pieces ===
- "White Fox: A Legend of Old China," McCall's Magazine, April 1929
- "The Forbidden City and Broadway," The Saturday Evening Post, September 14, 1929
- "Aviation in China," Flyers, October 1929
- "How China Went Air Minded," Flyers, November 1929
- "Wings for Women," Flyers, December 1929
- "Within the Golden City," The Saturday Evening Post, December 21, 1929
- "A Quiet Day with a Chinese Family," The Mentor, February 1930
- "Lady of the Lotus," The Household Magazine, February 1930
- "Golden Bells," Holland's, September 1930
- "Golden Phoenix," Good Housekeeping, December 1930
- "From Convent to Court," Pictorial Review, January 1931
- "Lustrous Jade," Good Housekeeping, February 1931
- "Beyond All Riches," Good Housekeeping, August 1931
- "The Chu Pao Tai," The Household Magazine, September 1931
- "At the Gate of Kwan Yin," Good Housekeeping, November 1931
- "The Honorable Five Blessings," Good Housekeeping, February 1932
- "America Sends Health to China," Physical Culture, March 1932
- "Pu-yi, The Puppet Emperor of Japan," The Saturday Evening Post, April 30, 1932
- "Singing Kites of Tai Shan," The Household Magazine, August 1932
- "The Kingdom of the Swallows," Good Housekeeping, February 1935
- "Looters of Ta Kuei", Air Action, April 1939.

== In popular culture ==
- The Yu sisters' life in the imperial court was dramatised in the 2006 Chinese television series Princess Der Ling, in which Der Ling was played by Zhang Jingjing. A rather romanticised depiction of Der Ling's life, especially her relationship with Kevin White (based on Thaddeus C. White, portrayed by Jonathan Kos-Read).
- In the 2010 Chinese-Japanese co-production series The Firmament of the Pleiades, the character Princess Shou An (Madam Zhang) is partially inspired by Princess Der Ling.
- Der Ling was portrayed by Rainky Wai in the 2016 Hong Kong television drama The Last Healer in Forbidden City.

== See also ==
- Arthur J. Burks – her primary ghostwriter
- Charles Yu Hsingling – Der Ling's elder brother
- Robert A. McLean
