= Charles Yu Hsingling =

Chinese engineer and diplomat

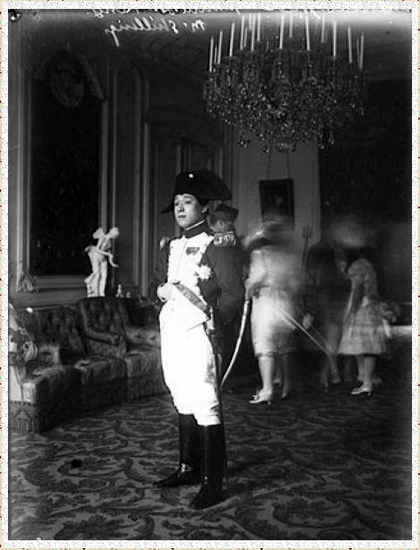
- Charles Hsingling costumed as Napoleon at a fancy dress ball in Paris, 1901.
- Born: 11 January 1879; Ou-Tchang-Fou, Hupeh, Qing Empire
- Occupations: Diplomat, engineer
- Spouse: Geneviève Deneu
- Parents: Yu Keng (father); Louisa Pierson (mother)
- Relatives: John Yu Shuinling (brother); Lizzie Yu Der Ling (sister); Nellie Yu Roung Ling (sister)

Charles Yu Hsingling (Chinese: 裕馨齡; pinyin: Yù Xīnlíng; Wade–Giles: Yü Hsin-ling; 11 January 1879 – ?), often referred to as Charles Hsingling, was a Hanjun Plain White bannerman who served as second secretary in the Qing-dynasty Embassy in France. He was also an engineer worked for the Qing imperial railways.

== Biography ==
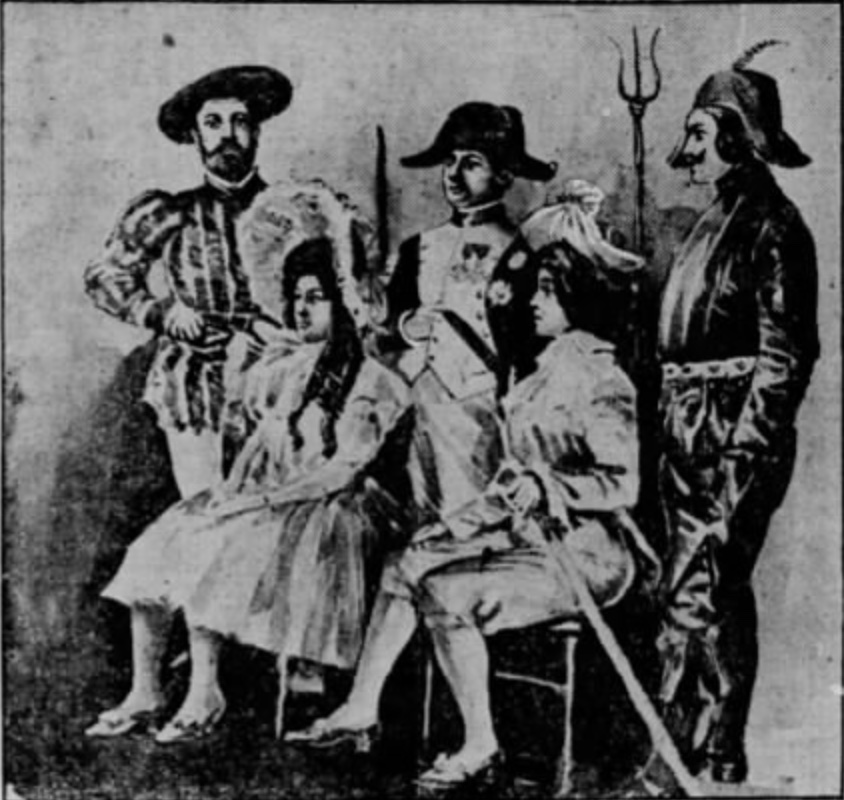
The Yu siblings at the fancy dress ball in 1901; from left: Commandant Armani as Francis I of France, Lizzie Yu Der Ling as a doll in the fairy tale, Charles Yu Hsingling as Napoleon, Nellie Yu Roung Ling as Prince Charming, and John Yu Shuinling as Pluto.

Born in an upper-class family, he was the younger son of Yu Keng, a high-ranking Qing official, and Louisa Pierson, a Chinese-American woman of mysterious antecedents. He had three siblings, the elder brother John Yu Shuinling, two younger sisters, Lizzie Yu Der Ling and Nellie Yu Roung Ling.

He was a Roman Catholic baptised at the wish of his mother, and, like his siblings, received Western education in American missionary school. The British diplomat Sir Robert Hart described them as "a noisy family of English-speaking children, were fluent also in Japanese and French".^{:52}

From 1899 to 1902, he served as second secretary in the Qing-dynasty Embassy in France, where his father held a diplomatic post. The Yu siblings led a cosmopolitan life in Paris, they socialised, frequented the theatre and performed at their parents' parties. The weekly magazine Armée et Marine reported that the four children of Minister Yu Keng "superbly performed" an English comedy in three acts at a soirée organised by their father.

In March 1901, the Yus threw a fancy dress ball at the Chinese Embassy to celebrate Chinese New Year, at which Hsingling was costumed as Napoleon, his siblings Shuinling, Roung Ling and Der Ling, were dressed respectively as Pluto, Prince Charming and a doll in the fairy tale.

He married Geneviève Deneu, a French piano teacher. The wedding took place at the Church of Saint-Philippe-du-Roule on 16 October 1902. Not much is known about his later life.
