= Black Medicine =

- Dust-jacket illustration by Lee Brown Coye.
- Author: Arthur J. Burks
- Cover artist: Lee Brown Coye
- Language: English
- Genre: Fantasy, Horror
- Publisher: Arkham House
- Publication date: 1966
- Publication place: United States
- Media type: Print (hardback)
- Pages: 308

Black Medicine is a collection of stories by American writer Arthur J. Burks. It was released in 1966 by Arkham House in an edition of 1,952 copies and was the author's first book published by Arkham House. All but one of the stories had originally appeared in the magazine Weird Tales.

== Contents ==
The collection contains the following short stories:

1. Strange Tales of Santo Domingo
  - "A Broken Lamp Chimney"
  - "Desert of the Dead"
  - "Daylight Shadows"
  - "The Sorrowful Sisterhood"
  - "The Phantom Chibo"
  - "Faces"
2. "Three Coffins"
3. "When the Graves Were Opened"
4. "Vale of the Corbies"
5. "Voodoo"
6. "Luisma's Return"
7. "Thus Spake the Prophetess"
8. "Black Medicine"
9. "Bells of Oceana"
10. "The Ghosts of Steamboat Coulee"
11. "Guatemozin the Visitant"

== Critical reception ==
E. F. Bleiler described Black Medicine as "a weak collection. The Caribbean stories show racial bias to the point of grotesqueness, and most of the other stories are routine pulp fiction. ["Three Coffins"] has points of interest, and ["Bells of Oceana"] is worth reading for a certain baroque, exuberant overkill of horror."

Set against the backdrop of the United States occupation of Haiti, the title story was the cover story for the August 1925 issue of Weird Tales. "What makes Burks' text interesting," wrote one critic, "is the chaotic mixture of imperial and anti-imperial sentiments." The protagonist specifically calls Haitians "dull and stupid", yet the Haitian characters are depicted as both formidable and sophisticated enough to have founded the society Burks calls "the Black Republic".

Burks was a U.S. Marine who had served in Haiti, In his Caribbean stories he "depicts Caribbean people as savage beasts", though Raphael Dalleo notes that "Burks's writing is representative of the discourse about the Caribbean that structured how West Indians ... would have been seen by a U.S. audience in the 1920s." "The most pointed hatred and derision," said another critic, "straight from the lexicon of homegrown racism":

Burks's Haiti was a site of sexual excess, gender disorder, and primitive savagery, It was a land characterized bt the effective absence of the family as a basis for social order. In Burks's telling, the grotesque horror of Haiti showed the obvious and urgent need for American rule there.

== Sources ==
- Jaffery, Sheldon (1989). The Arkham House Companion. Mercer Island, WA: Starmont House, Inc. p. 83. ISBN 1-55742-005-X.
- Chalker, Jack L.; Mark Owings (1998). The Science-Fantasy Publishers: A Bibliographic History, 1923-1998. Westminster, MD and Baltimore: Mirage Press, Ltd. p. 44.
- Joshi, S.T. (1999). Sixty Years of Arkham House: A History and Bibliography. Sauk City, WI: Arkham House. pp. 96–97. ISBN 0-87054-176-5.
- Nielsen, Leon (2004). Arkham House Books: A Collector's Guide. Jefferson, NC and London: McFarland & Company, Inc. p. 98. ISBN 0-7864-1785-4.
