= J. Keith Wilson =

American Asian art curator

- Occupation: Curator
- Employer: Smithsonian Institution
- Title: Curator of Ancient Chinese Art

J. Keith Wilson is an American Asian art curator. He is the associate director and curator of Ancient Chinese art at the Freer Gallery of Art and Arthur M. Sackler Gallery at the Smithsonian Institution in Washington, DC. Wilson is the former chief curator of Asian art at the Los Angeles County Museum of Art (LACMA).

Wilson obtained his degree in visual arts from Williams College in 1978. He worked as a curator at the Cleveland Museum of Art. He became the curator of Far Eastern art at LACMA in 1996. Wilson became the assistant director and curator of Chinese art at the Freer Gallery of Art and Arthur M. Sackler Gallery in 2006.
