= Nellie Yu Roung Ling =

Multiracial dancer of Chinese-American descent

Nellie Yu Yü Roung Ling Princess Shou Shan Madame Dan Pao Tchao
- Commandery princess of Qing dynasty
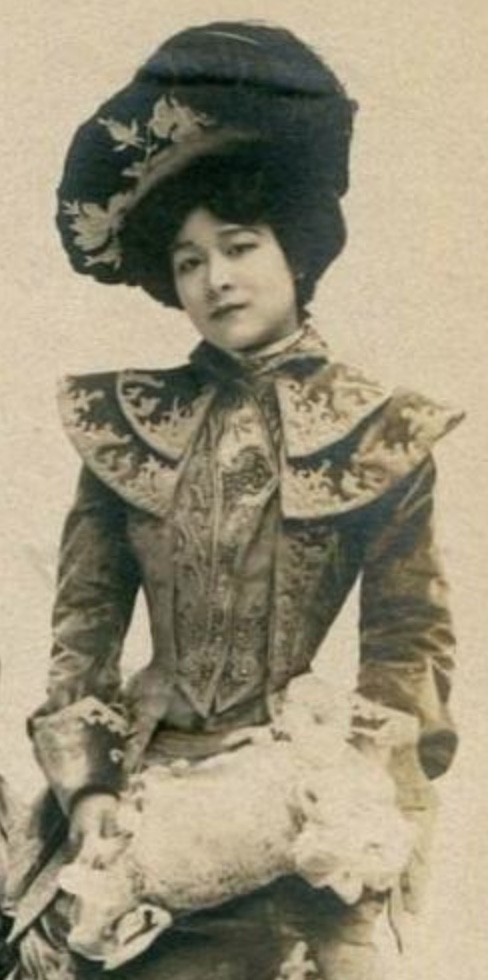
- Nellie Yu in Paris, 1900.
- Born: Nellie Yü Roung Ling; 1882; Tientsin, Qing dynasty
- Died: 16 January 1973 (aged 90–91); Beijing, People's Republic of China
- Spouse: Dan Pao Tchao
- Father: Yu Keng
- Mother: Louisa Pierson
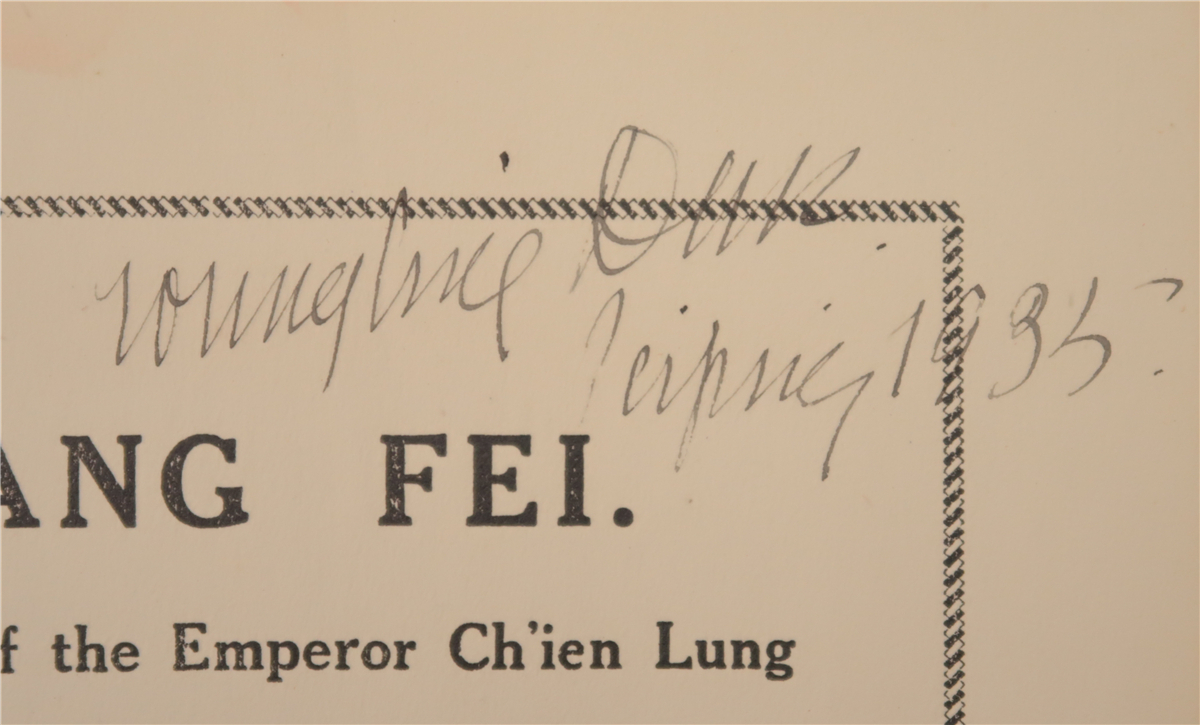
- Signature

Nellie Yu Roung Ling (Chinese: 裕容齡; pinyin: Yù Rónglíng; Wade–Giles: Yü Jung-ling; 1882 – 16 January 1973), also spelt Nelly, was a Hanjun Plain White bannerwoman and dancer, who is considered "the first modern dancer of China". She was the younger daughter of Yu Keng and Louisa Pierson, and her older sister was Lizzie Yu Der Ling.

Although not a member of the Qing imperial family, Roung Ling was given the title of "commandery princess" while serving as a lady-in-waiting for Empress Dowager Cixi.^{:268} She was also known as Yu Roon(g) Ling, especially in the works of her sister Der Ling.^{:267} She was referred to as Madame Dan Pao Tchao after her marriage to the General Dan Pao Tchao (唐寳潮; 1887–1958), and Princess Shou Shan, a title appearing on the cover of her 1934 historical novella about the Fragrant Concubine (Hsiang Fei), a name Sir Reginald Johnston claimed she never used.^{:xii}

== Early life ==
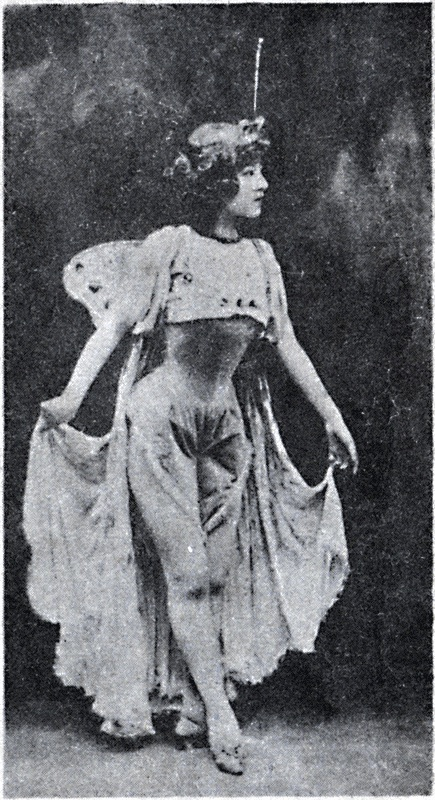
Roung Ling in butterfly dress during her performance of Rose and Butterfly in Paris, 1902.

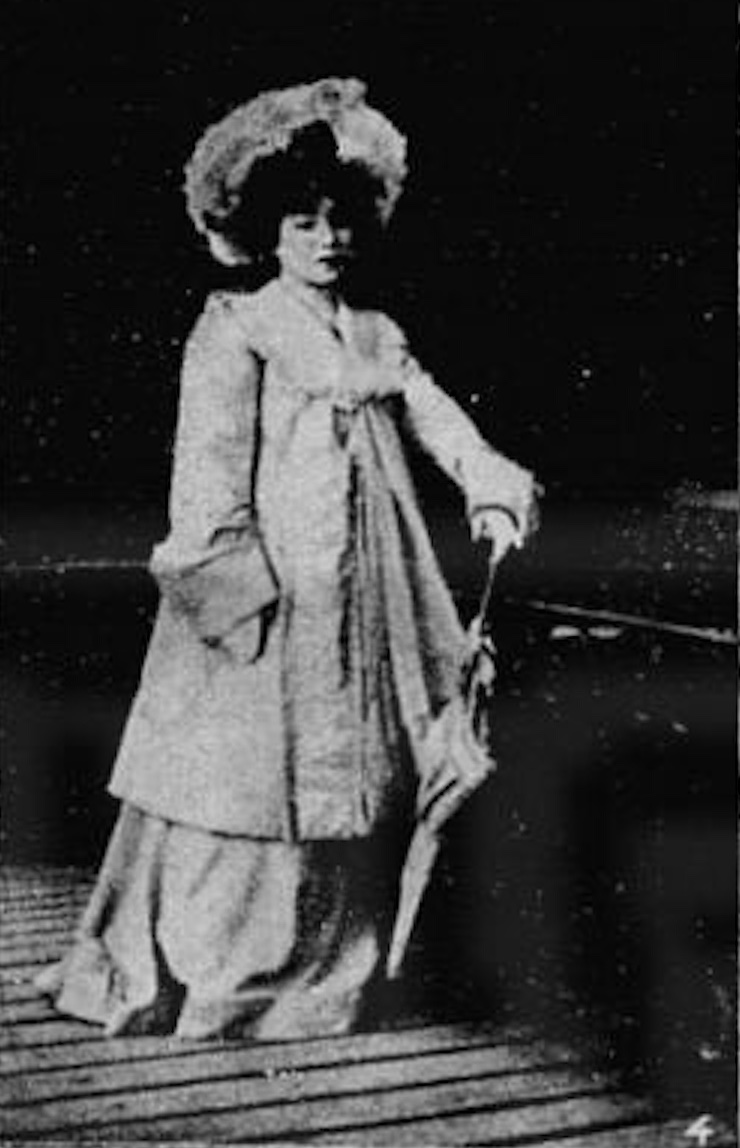
Roung Ling in 1902. "The stamp of western culture which she received in those early years causes her today, in Parisian costume which she frequently wears, to be mistaken for a French woman." — San Pedro Daily News

Yu Roung Ling was born in an upper-class family to a Chinese father and a Chinese-American mother who was the daughter of an American naval officer. The Yu sisters, like their two brothers Charles Yu Hsingling and John Yu Shuinling, received Western education in American missionary school—then an almost unheard-of proceeding amongst high Manchu officials—and were fluent in English. The British diplomat Sir Robert Hart described them as "a noisy family of English-speaking children, were fluent also in Japanese and French".^{:52} She was also well versed in poetry, especially the works of E. B. Browning.

In 1895, Roung Ling's father Yu Keng was appointed minister to Japan, and he later took his family there. It was in Japan that she discovered her vocation for dance, where she gave an impromptu performance of a Japanese dance Tsurukame (crane-tortoise) she had learned from a servant, before the assembled Japanese dignitaries.

In 1899, Roung Ling left for France with her father, as he was to take up his new post as minister-plenipotentiary to the French Third Republic. In Paris, she was placed in charge of the sisters of the Sacred Heart Convent School (ancien Couvent du Sacré-Cœur) located at 77 Rue de Varenne.^{:83}

The Yu family quickly adopted Parisian fashion, with media coverage at the time reporting that all the children of Minister Yu Keng "wear European costume and follow the fashions closely", and called Roung Ling "a charming Chinese girl who is Parisian in all but name". The New York Times wrote, "[Der Ling and Roung Ling] are adorably pretty, and they dress in the European style with a finish and skill to which something of Oriental charm is added which makes them the cynosure of all eyes when they enter a drawingroom [sic]".

The Yu siblings led a cosmopolitan life in Paris; they socialised, frequented the theatre, and performed at their parents' parties. The weekly magazine Armée et Marine reported that the four children of Minister Yu Keng "superbly performed" the English comedy in three acts, Sweet Lavender, at a soirée organised by their father.

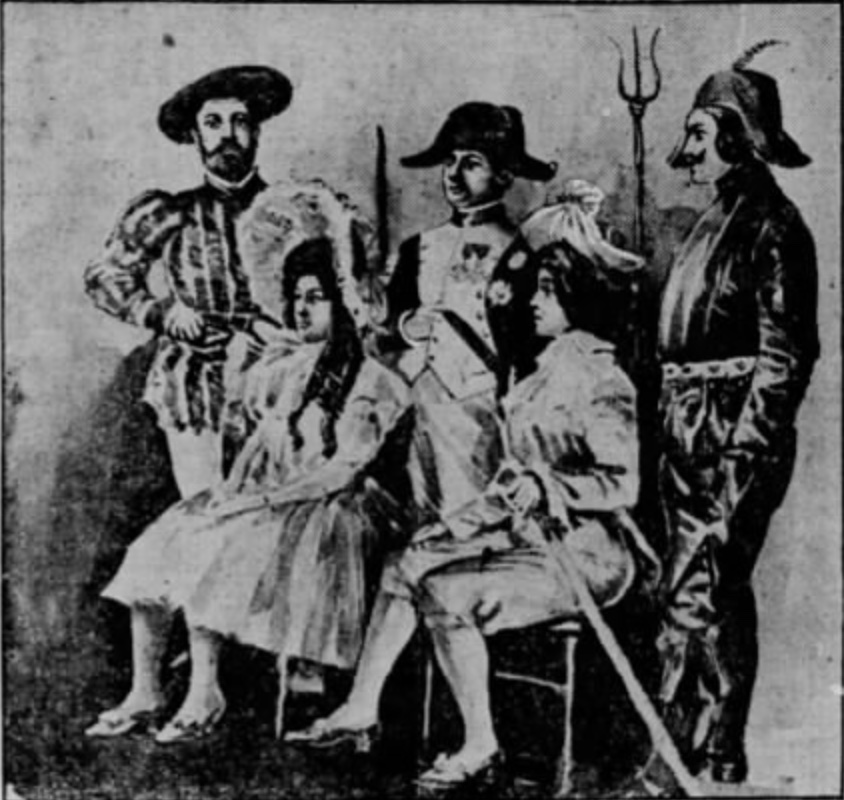
The Yu siblings at the Chinese New Year celebration ball in 1901; from left: Commandant Armani as Francis I of France, Lizzie Yu Der Ling as a doll, Charles Hsingling as Napoleon, Nellie Yu Roung Ling as Prince Charming, and John Yu Shuin Ling as Pluto.

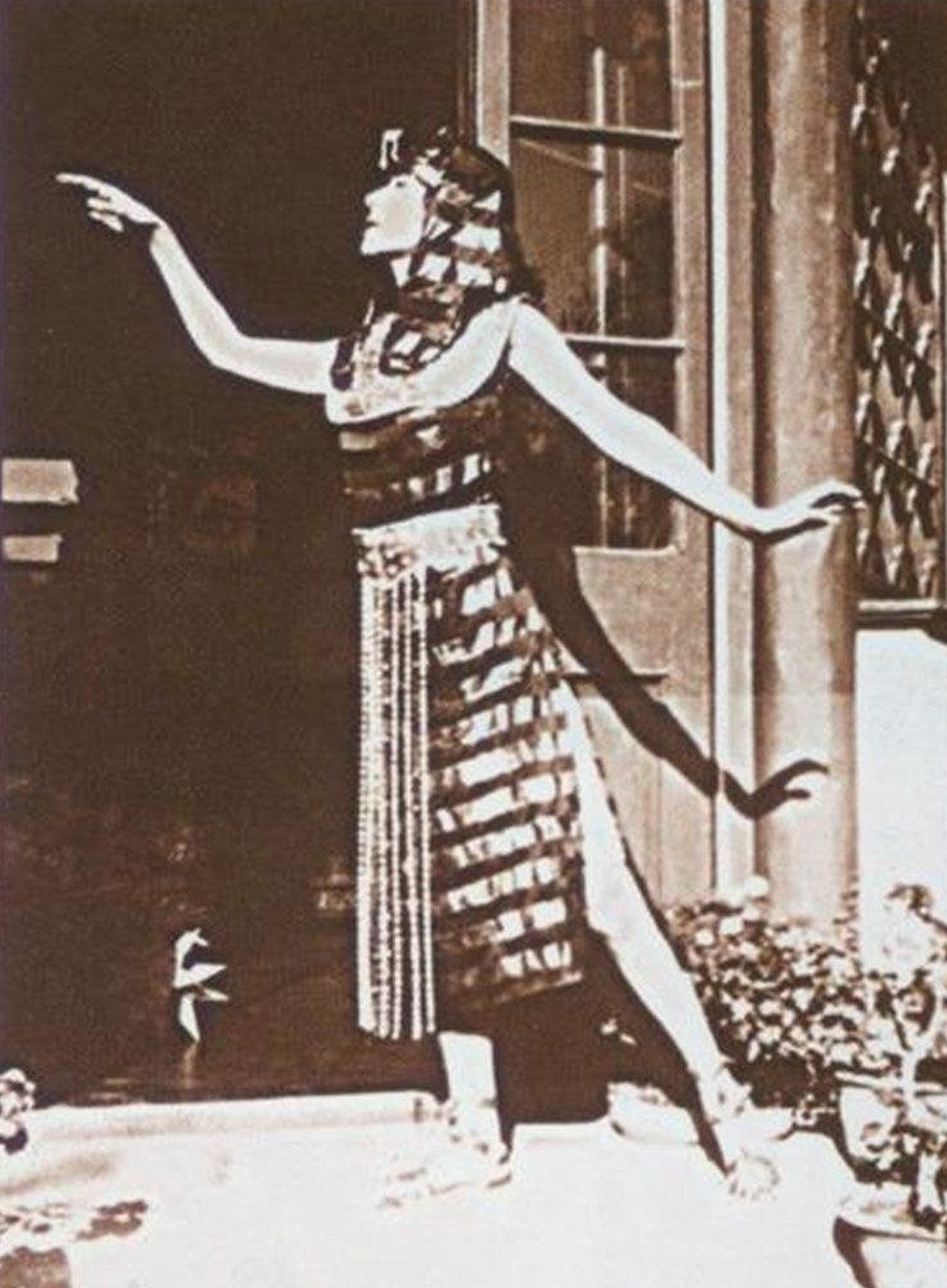
Roung Ling in ancient Egyptian style costume for her performance of Greek Dance at Summer Palace, 1904.

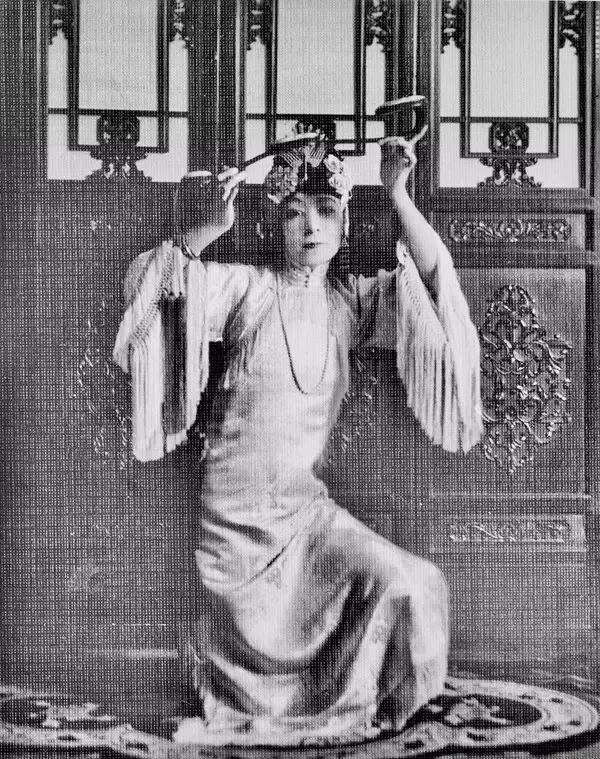
Roung Ling in traditional Chinese style costume for her performance of "Ruyi Dance" (Ruyi, lit. 'As You Like It') at Summer Palace.

In March 1901, the Yu family threw a fancy dress ball at the Chinese Embassy to celebrate the Chinese New Year, at which Roung Ling was costumed as Prince Charming, and her siblings Der Ling, Hsingling, and Shuin Ling, were dressed respectively as a doll in the fairy tale, Napoleon and Pluto. The Chicago Sunday Tribune reported that "Lord Yu is particularly proud of his Europeanised family". The Yu couple gave their daughters unheard-of freedom to enjoy European-style ballroom dancing with close body contact with foreign men. Their lifestyle caused outrage for other Manchu mission officials, and the family was denounced to the throne; however, the Empress Dowager Cixi liked what they were doing and waited impatiently for their return.

After attending the coronation of Edward VII and Alexandra, Prince Zaizhen and his entourage were greeted by the Yu family on their return from London. Both Sir Liang Cheng and Prince Zaizhen were quite taken with the Yu sisters. Liang reported back to the court that both girls "would quite fascinate the Empress Dowager if they go to Peking". The Yu sisters liked Prince Zaizhen too, "immensely", as Der Ling remembered, he was "very handsome, well educated, and his tastes were the same as ours in many things".^{:114} She added that while she and the prince were prone to quarrel, Zaizhen paid court to her softer, prettier sister. Liang Cheng also found himself drawn to Roung Ling:^{:114} the two had been engaged at least as early as January 1903, but for some unknown reason, they were never married to each other.

During her stay in Paris, apart from studying acting with Sarah Bernhardt, Roung Ling also studied modern dance with Isadora Duncan. For the latter, she improvised a few dance steps during their first meeting, and Duncan was deeply impressed by her talent and decided to teach her for free;^{:166–167} she thus became one of the first Chinese people to learn Western choreography.^{:267}

In 1902, Roung Ling played the part of a Loie Fuller–inspired butterfly girl in Rose and Butterfly, and also danced in Greek Dance, in both of which she was well received by audiences.^{:268} In the same year, the Yu family travelled through Spain, Germany, Italy, and Russia before arriving back in China in January 1903.

== Lady-in-waiting ==
Soon after her return to China, Roung Ling was installed as one of the court ladies to the Empress Dowager Cixi, together with her sister Der Ling. While in the court, she studied traditional Chinese dance and integrated it with Western elements in her own way to creating a unique style. She developed from this combination a series of dance styles of Eastern aesthetic with Western technique known as "Bodhisattva Dance", "Fan Dance", "Ruyi Dance", "Sword Dance", and "Lotus Fairy Dance".^{:168} She also introduced Western dance to the imperial court; she performed Greek Dance at the Summer Palace in 1904, and a Spanish dance on the eve of the Dragon Boat Festival.^{:268}

She had a love affair with the Guangxu Emperor, but probably in secret on account of the empress dowager's informers. The French writer Marc Chadourne called her the emperor's "Saint Helena"; years later, she told the former with melancholy that the emperor had proposed to her to be his concubine.

Roung Ling temporarily moved to Shanghai in 1905, due to her father's illness.^{:268} In 1908, she left the court after the death of the empress dowager. Almost twenty years later, in 1926, she recalled:

It is amusing now to think of those days. I was so young and so little that I could not possibly wear the beautiful and elaborate Manchu head dress and without it the court costume wasn't complete; so they dressed me in boy's clothes. I was glad because they were so much more comfortable to wear but still it took more than an hour every morning to have my hair dressed. We had to get up early, always by half past six or seven o'clock to be ready to go to the empress' apartments to wish her 'good morning'. [...] I always went to audiences with the empress. It was quite a long way to go in the palace; but it was easy for me in my boy's clothes to get about. I used to stand or sit on the floor behind a screen where I could hear everything, but of course I was too young to understand much of what was said.

== Later life ==
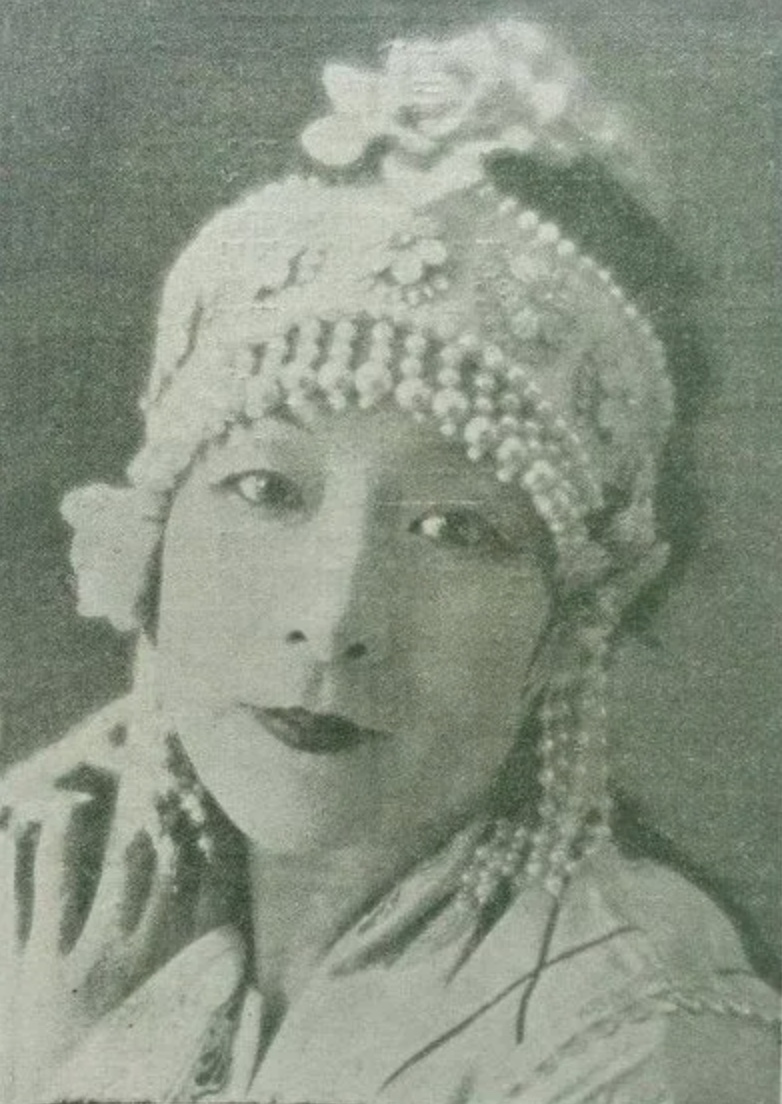
Roung Ling in the 1920s

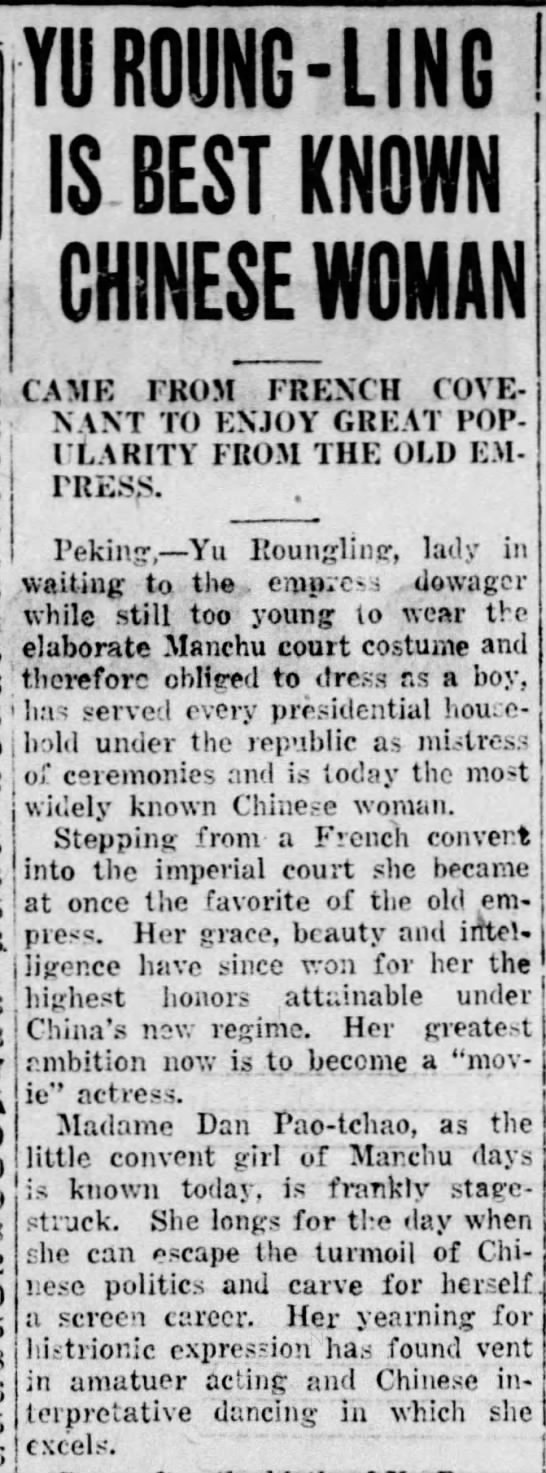
"Madame Dan Pao-tchao, as the little convent girl of Manchu days is known today, is frankly stage-struck." — The Daily Tribune, 23 March 1926

Shortly after the fall of the Qing Empire, in 1912, Roung Ling married Dan Pao Tchao, a nephew of Tang Shao-yi, who studied at the École spéciale militaire de Saint-Cyr in France, and was a counsellor in the office of the Republican president with the rank of general. During the Republican era (1912–1949), she was appointed Mistress of Ceremonies to President Li Yuan-hung, and the couple enjoyed a prominent position in Peking high society.

It was a happy marriage; however, she probably had a secret relationship with Saint-John Perse, a French poet-diplomat who served as secretary to the French embassy in Peking from 1916 to 1921. A few years later, she confided in Hélène Hoppenot that Perse never loved her, but she was useful to him for obtaining information from the Republic's high society.

During the 1920s, she organised numerous charity performances and participated in many other charity events. In 1921, she gave a speech in English about her life in the Manchu imperial court at the Teng Shih K'ou Congregational Church, in aid of the "School for Poor Children" charity funds.

The American writer Grace Seton-Thompson met Roung Ling while being greeted in a public audience with President Li Yuan-hung. Thompson wrote in her travelogue, Chinese Lanterns;

The event was organised by Madame Dan, mistress of ceremonies to the president. She is also Madame President's (吳敬君) contact with the diplomatic circles in Peking. She skillfully combines the elegance of the West and the nobility of the East, forming a charm beyond imagination. [...] But, these are not all the factors that make up her personality. The 'secret' lies in her femininity from the inside out, in a warm and loving heart. Those cumbersome rituals actually take up very little of her time. She has devoted her life to charity, which has almost become a habit.

In addition to charitable activities, Roung Ling was involved in English teaching projects and a fashion design programme; for the latter, she founded China's first women's clothing design research society. Her opinion on the changes in women's fashion in China contradicted a 1933 Vogue article—"Sometimes the Twain Do Meet"—which held that Western influence was the source of change in China. She stated, "Chinese fashions have been completely transformed by the Manchu influence which substituted the long dress for the old-fashioned tunic blouse. This dress must be long and straight and have a stiff, high collar." She brought up the New Life Movement's opposition to Chinese women's dressing in ways that seemed too Western or flamboyant, to argue that Western fashions appeared immodest in China and were not accepted. She also acted as hostess for an exhibition of excavated textiles and robes titled Marco Polo's invitation. The British writer Harold Acton acknowledged Roung Ling's pivotal cultural role in the new Republic in his book Memoirs of an Aesthete.

In the mid 1920s she expressed her desire to become a film actress, but that dream was not realised. In 1926, the American diplomat John Van Antwerp MacMurray filmed a three-minute sequence of Roung Ling performing a "Sword Dance" in front of the Temple of Heaven.

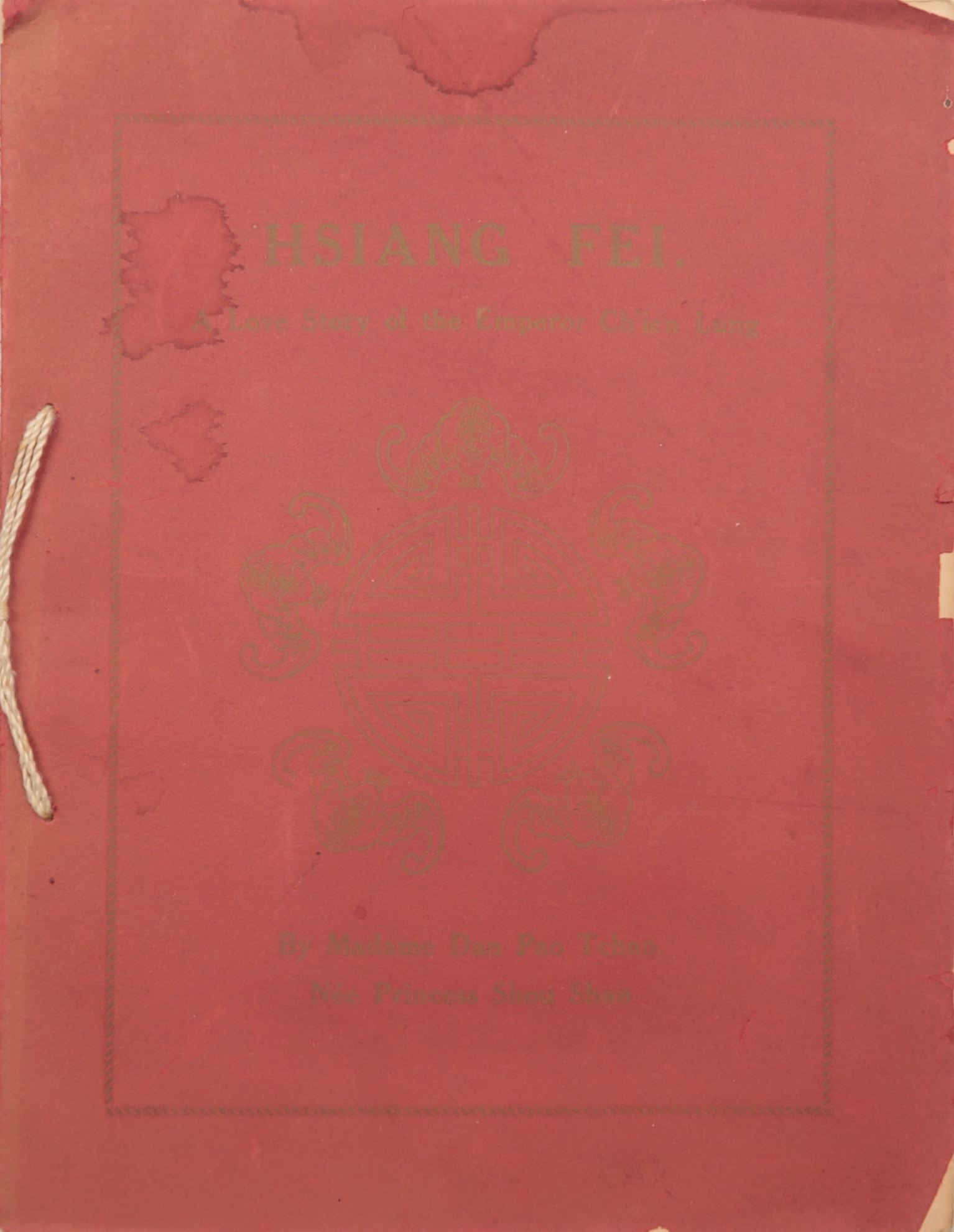
Cover

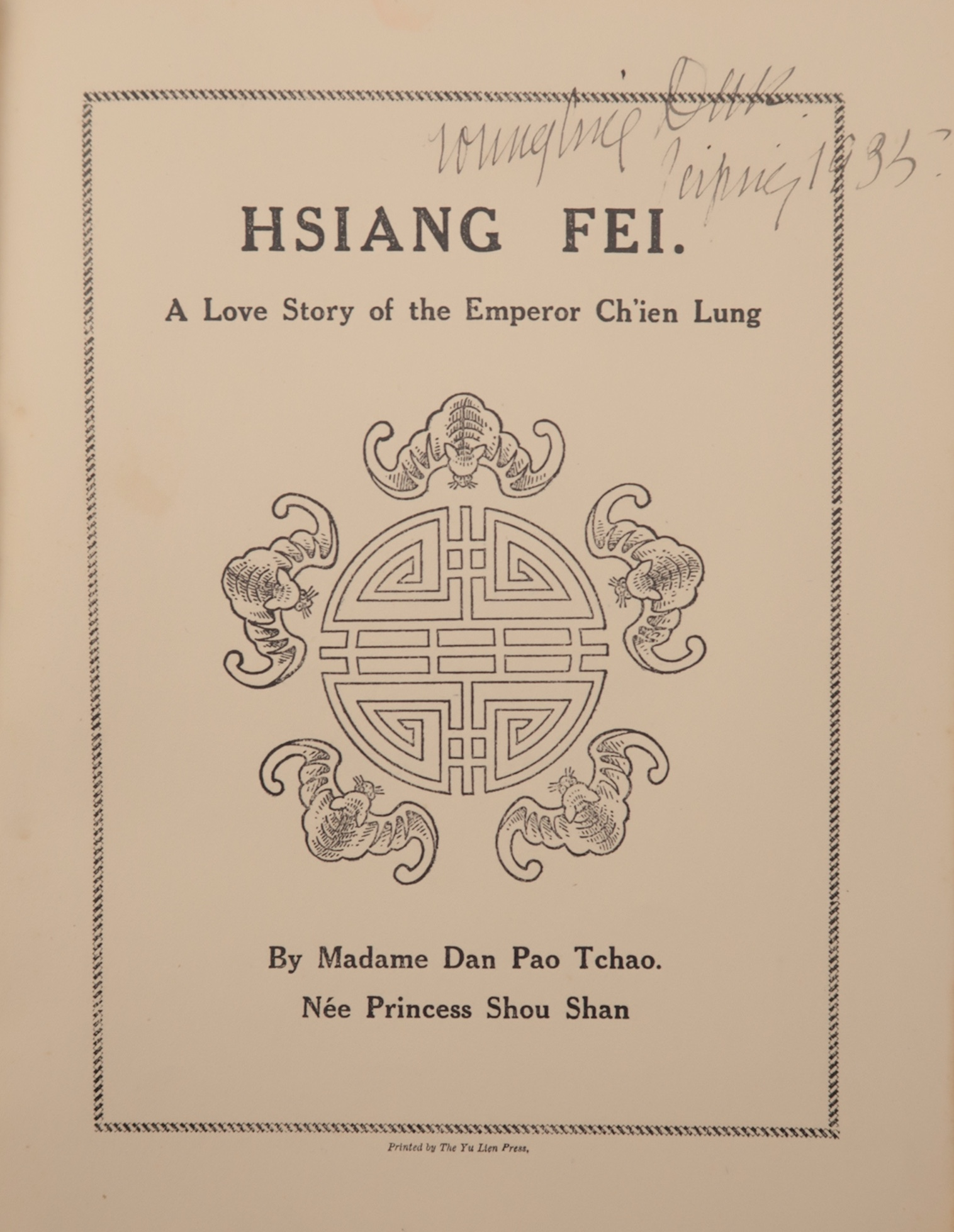
Title page

Hsiang Fei: A Love Story of the Emperor Ch’ien Lung, second edition published in 1934.

In 1930, she published in English a historical novella about the Fragrant Concubine of the Qianlong Emperor titled Hsiang Fei: A Love Story of the Emperor Ch’ien Lung. A second edition was released in 1934. In 1936, she wrote a foreword for the Chinese translation of Der Ling's Imperial Incense, at the invitation of its translator Chin Shou-ou.^{:268} In 1937, she performed an American dance at the Peiping Charity Fair.

After the communist takeover of China in 1949, Roung Ling and her husband managed by various strategies to negotiate their survival during the early years of Mao's regime. After an interview in April 1957, the photojournalist Zhang Zudao (張祖道) gave a description of his first impression of Roung Ling which shed some light on her later life:

She has a well-featured face, no wrinkles except for the forehead. Bright eyes, fair skin, she is of well-proportioned, medium stature, with a tidy haircut with both sides tucked neatly behind the ears. A thin coat of face powder and lipstick, close-fitting black velvet dress in Chinese style with shiny antique silver buttons, making her look elegant especially in a 'workerised, peasantised and soldierised' society where the monotonous short hair for everyman, pigtails for everywoman and bluish-grey uniform for everyone.

She penned a memoir titled Qinggong suoji (Chinese: 清宮瑣記; lit. 'Fragmentary Records of the Qing Palaces', or more idiomatically, 'Memoir of My Life at the Manchu Imperial Court'), which was published in 1957, recounting her early years in the imperial palace as a lady-in-waiting. It was a bestseller when it was published, and was later severely criticised for its "propaganda of the Four Olds".

At the height of the sociopolitical purge movement of the Cultural Revolution (1966–1976), Roung Ling was labelled a symbol of "feudalism, bourgeoisie and revisionism" due to her early years in France and the imperial Qing court, and the social status she held during the Republican era; she was dragged from her apartment by a group of Red Guards who broke both her legs as a symbolic action. She had to live in a dilapidated single-storey bungalow because of the forcible occupation of her residence by a residents' committee. According to the children of her longtime friends, despite her two broken legs and the unpleasant living conditions, her composure and sense of humour remained intact. Every time they visited her, she chatted about funny stories from her youth, and the younger generation roared with laughter. She died of pulmonary infection in Peking University First Hospital, in 1973.

The Dan couple had no children of their own, but left an adopted daughter, Lydia Dan (唐麗題, 1915–2002; the future Lydia na Ranong [ลิเดีย ณ ระนอง]), whose biological father was Wang Tseng Sze (王曾思, 1890–1944), the first secretary of the Chinese Legation in Paris during the 1920s. Lydia married Chok na Ranong (โชค ณ ระนอง) and became a confidante of senior royals of Bangkok. Lydia began studying political science at Radcliffe College in 1941, then attended Harvard University from 1942 to 1944.

== Publications ==
- Hsiang Fei: A Love Story of the Emperor Ch’ien Lung, Peiping: The Yu Lien Press, 1930 (second edition 1934; foreword by Hardy Jowett)
- Qinggong suoji (清宮瑣記, idiomatic translation: 'Memoir of My Life at the Manchu Imperial Court'), Beijing: Beijing Publishing House, 1957

== In popular culture ==
- The Yu sisters' life in the imperial court was dramatised in the 2006 television series Princess Der Ling, in which Roung Ling was portrayed by Sun Yifei.

== See also ==
- List of dancers
- Eileen Chang – a Republican-era Chinese American writer
- Alice Lee – a late-Qing and Republican-era activist and writer
- Oei Hui-lan – a Republican-era socialite and style icon
- Anna May Wong – first Chinese American Hollywood actress
- Paris in the Belle Époque
