= Lü Zhong =

Chinese actress

- Born: 17 December 1940 (age 85); Baoji, Shaanxi, China
- Occupation: actress
- Years active: 1974～present
- Spouse: Wu Guiling (m. 1962; died 2016)
- Children: 2 (Wu Bing and Wu Qing)
- Awards: Asia Pacific Screen Award; Best Actress; 2014 Red Amnesia

Chinese name
- Traditional Chinese: 呂中
- Simplified Chinese: 吕中
Transcriptions

Lü Zhong (born 17 December 1940) is a Chinese actress.

== Selected filmography ==
=== Film ===
Year	Title	Role	Notes
1993	Blue Kite 蓝风筝	Mrs. Lan	
2005	The Parking Attendant In July 看车人的七月	Teacher	
2010	Aftershock 唐山大地震	Grandma	
2014	Red Amnesia 闯入者	Deng Meijuan	Asia Pacific Screen Award for Best Performance by an Actress; Chinese Film Media Award for Best Actress; Nominated - China Film Director's Guild Awards for Best Actress; Nominated - Golden Rooster Award for Best Actress
2016	Be Not Trivial Matter		
2016	Making Family		
2019	For Love with You		

=== Television series ===
Year	Title	Role	Notes
1991	Ni Wei Shui Bian Hu? 你为谁辩护？	Mei Zhen	Nominated - Feitian Award for Outstanding Actress
1993	Wu Zetian 武则天	Madame Wei	
1994	Romance of Three Kingdoms 三国演义	Empress Dong	
1995	Deng Yingchao and Her Mother 邓颖超和她的妈妈	Yang Zhende	Feitian Award for Outstanding Actress
1996	States of East Zhou Dynast 东周列国	Mrs. Xing	
2002	For the Sake of the Republic of China 走向共和	Empress Dowager Cixi	
2002	Chinese Marriage 中国式离婚	Lin's mother	
2003-2010	Detective DiRenjie 神探狄仁杰	Wu Zetian	Four Seasons
2006	Princess Der Ling 德龄公主	Empress Dowager Cixi	
2009	Empire of Qin 大秦帝国之裂变	Empress Dowager	
2012	To Elderly With Love 老无所依	Fang Qiong	
2012	Vicissitudes’ Course of Uprightness 人间正道是沧桑	Qu's mom	Nominated - China Television Director Committee Award for Best Supporting Actress
2013	Mother will Marry 娘要嫁人	Qi's mom	China Television Director Committee Award for Best Supporting Actress

=== Theatre ===
Year	Title	Role	Notes
1979	Thunderstorm 雷雨	Zhou Fanyi	
1984	Family 家	Concubine Chen	
2010	Wild Field 原野	Jiao's mom	
2012	Jia Zi Yuan 甲子园	Yan Meiyi	
