= Jonathan Kos-Read =

American actor (born 1973)

- Born: 1973 (age 51–52); Torrance, California, U.S.
- Occupation: Actor

Jonathan Kos-Read (born 1973), also known by the stage name Cao Cao (Chinese: 曹操; pinyin: Cáo Cāo), is an American film and television actor who has worked mostly in China. While well known in China, his work is little-known in the United States. Kos-Read's Chinese stage name is namesaked after the infamous penultimate chancellor of the late Eastern Han dynasty, a historical figure well-known to most Chinese people via the classic literature Romance of the Three Kingdoms.

== Early life and education ==
Kos-Read was born in Torrance, California, in 1973. He attended the film and acting schools of New York University, but completed his university career there studying molecular biology. Kos-Read began studying Mandarin Chinese at New York University, and re-located to China in 1997. His first acting role was in 1999.

== Career ==
Kos-Read's roles have included: Kevin White in Princess Der Ling (2006), a cameo in Fit Lover (2008, also starring Nie Bing), Babi in My Fair Gentleman (2009, co-starring Kelly Lin and Sun Honglei), Pastor Landdeck in Empire of Silver (2009, also starring Aaron Kwok and Jennifer Tilly), Mark in Mojin: The Lost Legend (2015) and Alexander Cunningham in Xuanzang (2016). Kos-Read has also been featured on Here Comes Cao Cao, a reality program about his life broadcast on Beijing Television. The title of the show was a reference to the Chinese proverb "Speak of Cao Cao, and Cao Cao will be there" ("说曹操曹操就到"), roughly equivalent to the English saying, "Speak of the devil." He has starred in more than 75 productions. As a Caucasian who is fully fluent in Mandarin Chinese, Kos-Read frequently appears as the foreign love interest or villain, in roles that sometimes present stereotypical images of non-Chinese people. In 2009, he also appeared on stage with Tafelmusik Baroque Orchestra in a Mandarin-language version of the orchestra's multi-media concert piece "The Galileo Project: Music of the Spheres," in performances in Kuala Lumpur and Beijing. At the 2008 Summer Olympics in Beijing, Kos-Read was one of those chosen to carry the Olympic torch on its way to the Olympic Stadium.

Kos-Read had a successful career as a male model.

In 2021, Kos-Read published his first novel, The Eunuch, a mystery set in Imperial China.

== Personal life ==
Kos-Read is married to a Chinese citizen, Li Zhiyin, with whom he has two daughters, Roxanne and Persephone. While continuing to work in the Chinese film industry, he has relocated to Barcelona, Spain with his family.
