= The Sultan of Llang-Llang =

American hoaxer (1887–1943)

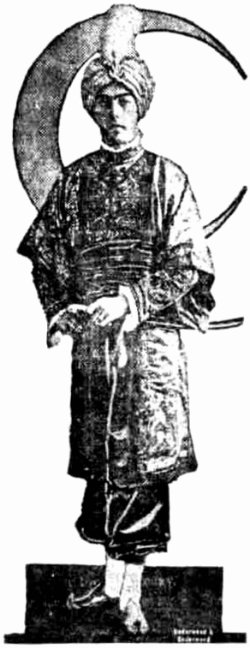
- Born: Robert Armistead McLean Jr. April 14, 1887; San Francisco, California
- Died: December 25, 1943 (aged 56); Alameda, California
- Occupations: U.S. Marine, journalist, publicist, fiction author
- Known for: The Sultan of Llang-Llang Hoax

Robert A. McLean (1887–1943) was a Marine Corps recruiter stationed in Manhattan just after World War I. In late 1919, near the end of his term of enlistment, he planted a story about himself with the New York World. The story described how McLean had just learned of the death of the Sultan of Llang-Llang, who McLean had befriended in Mindanao, the Philippines, while serving with the Marines during the Moro Rebellion (1902–13). The sultan had unexpectedly bequeathed his estate to McLean, which included the island sultanate of Llang-Llang, its wealth, and the sultan's harem of forty wives, making McLean the new Sultan of Llang-Llang. The titillating story immediately became a sensation, provoking widespread national–and even international–interest. The New York press hounded McLean for more details, which he provided. He was soon photographed for papers in a sultan costume. He failed to escape the spotlight when he returned to the San Francisco Bay Area to settle down with his wife Eva Margaret Wisniewski (1898–1984) and found the local press waiting. His story eventually collapsed after two months when Hadji Gulamu Rasul, a visiting student from the Sultanate of Sulu, recognized the story as a fake and went public, forcing McLean to confess. McLean’s hoax went down as the "biggest press-agent fake in history". Thereafter, he retained the enduring title of "world's champion news faker".

== Background ==
McLean was the son of renowned University of California surgeon, Robert Armistead McLean (1851–1918). As the eldest of three sons, his father expected Robert Jr. to follow him into medicine. Instead, Robert Jr. enlisted in the Marines in 1906; after basic training, he was sent to the Philippines and did, in fact, serve on Mindanao in 1907.

After a military career beset by disciplinary actions, during World War I McLean found his footing as a Marine recruiter in the New York City vicinity. After being stationed in the Manhattan office, he became acquainted with New York newspapers, their editors and correspondents, and the process of getting pro-recruiting articles into print. This gave him the experience and connections to launch the Llang-Llang hoax.

Throughout his career, he published in a variety of fields (journalism, public relations, short stories, true confessions, true crime) and referred to himself unashamedly as a hack writer.

== Selected journalism ==
- "News Hound Repents and Confesses Deeds", The Recruiters' Bulletin, July 1919.
- "A Night Encounter with a Python", Everybody's Magazine, July 1926.
- "Know Your Stuff", The Leatherneck, May 1927.
- "In Line of Duty", American Detective, September 1937.
- "The $50,000,000 Spook House", Family Circle, November 25, 1938.
- "First You Go Up, Then You Go Down", Writer’s Digest, June 1939.

== Selected fiction ==
- "Corporal's Chevrons", The Leatherneck, January 1929.
- "Sob Stuff", Complete Detective Novel Magazine, November 1929.
- "The Stone God’s Justice", Wide World Adventures, June 1930.
- "Dog-Robber", The Leatherneck, April 1932.
- "Jungle Pay-Off", The Leatherneck, November 1932.
- "A Quiet Night at Balinag", The Leatherneck, September 1936.
- "Words and Music", 10 Story Book, October 1936.

== Resources ==
- Robert T. Legge, M.D., "The Lure of Medical History: Robert Armistead McLean: California's First Master Surgeon," California and Western Medicine, February 1938. McLean family history.
- John Locke, The Princess, the Speed-King, and the Sultan of Llang-Llang: How Three Writers Pulled Off the Wildest Hoax of the Jazz Age (Elkhorn, California: Off-Trail Publications, 2026). Includes a bio of McLean and his hoaxing history.
