= Yu Keng =

Qing diplomat and father of Princess Der Ling

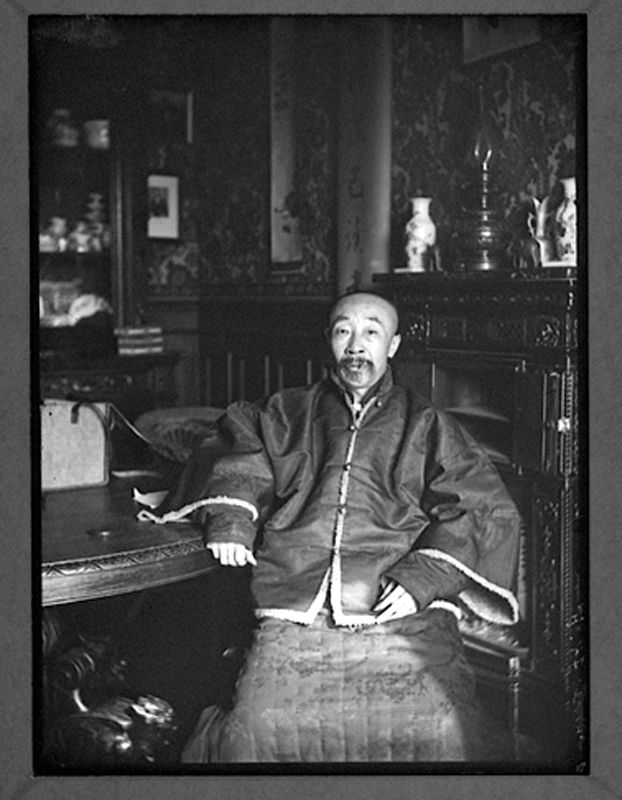
Yu Keng in 1900

Yu Keng (Chinese: 裕庚 ; pinyin: Yù Gēng ; Wade: Yü Kêng ), or, in France, Yu-Keng (19th century – 18 December 1905) was a Chinese diplomat who served as Chinese ambassador to France, then to Japan.

== Family ==
- Princess Der Ling (daughter)
- Nellie Yu Roung Ling (daughter)
