= Ewer with the head of a rooster =

13th-century Iranian ceramic ewer

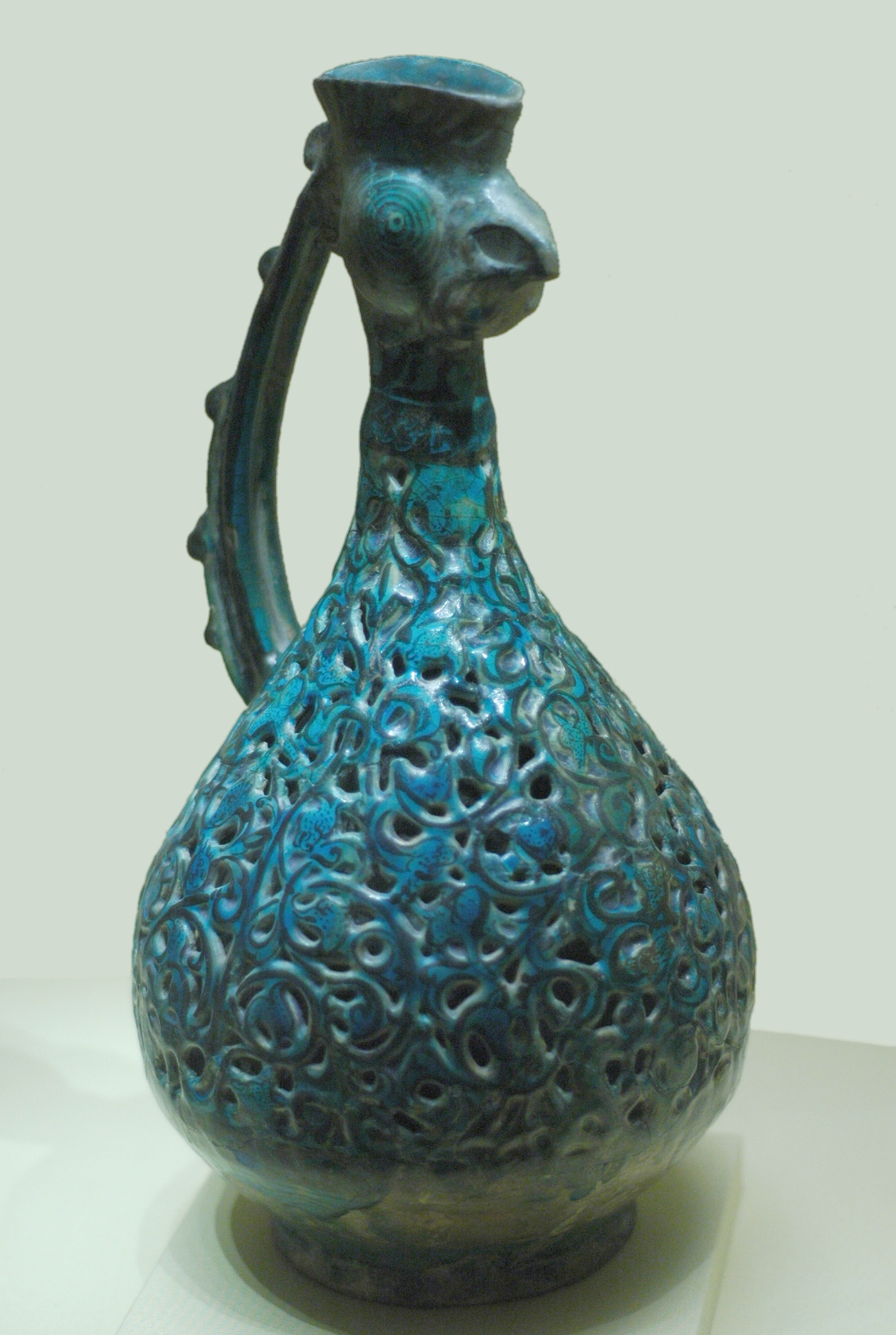
- The ewer with the head of a rooster
- Artist: Unknown
- Year: 13th century
- Medium: Siliceous ceramic
- Dimensions: 40 cm (16 in)
- Location: Louvre Museum, showcase 40, Department of Islamic Arts, Paris, France

Ewer with the head of a rooster is a ceramic ewer kept in the department of Islamic arts of the Louvre museum. It is representative of a type of production found in the art of the Seljuk dynasty of Iran of the 13th century.

== History ==
The ewer was made between 1210 and 1220 in a pottery workshop in Kashan, Iran. A reticulated jug (see photograph below) at the Metropolitan Museum of Art (New York), also pierced and dated 1215, allows us to locate the beginnings of these reticulated decorations at the beginning of the 13th century.

The ewer has been in the Louvre since 1970, following a donation from the Société des Amis du Louvre which acquired it for Fr25,000 (approximately €3,800). It was previously in the collection of Jacques Acheroff. The piece was presented at the 1903 Muslims Arts Exhibition at the Musée des Arts décoratifs (Paris), organized under the direction of Gaston Migeon, curator at the Louvre, and Raymond Kœchlin.

== Description ==
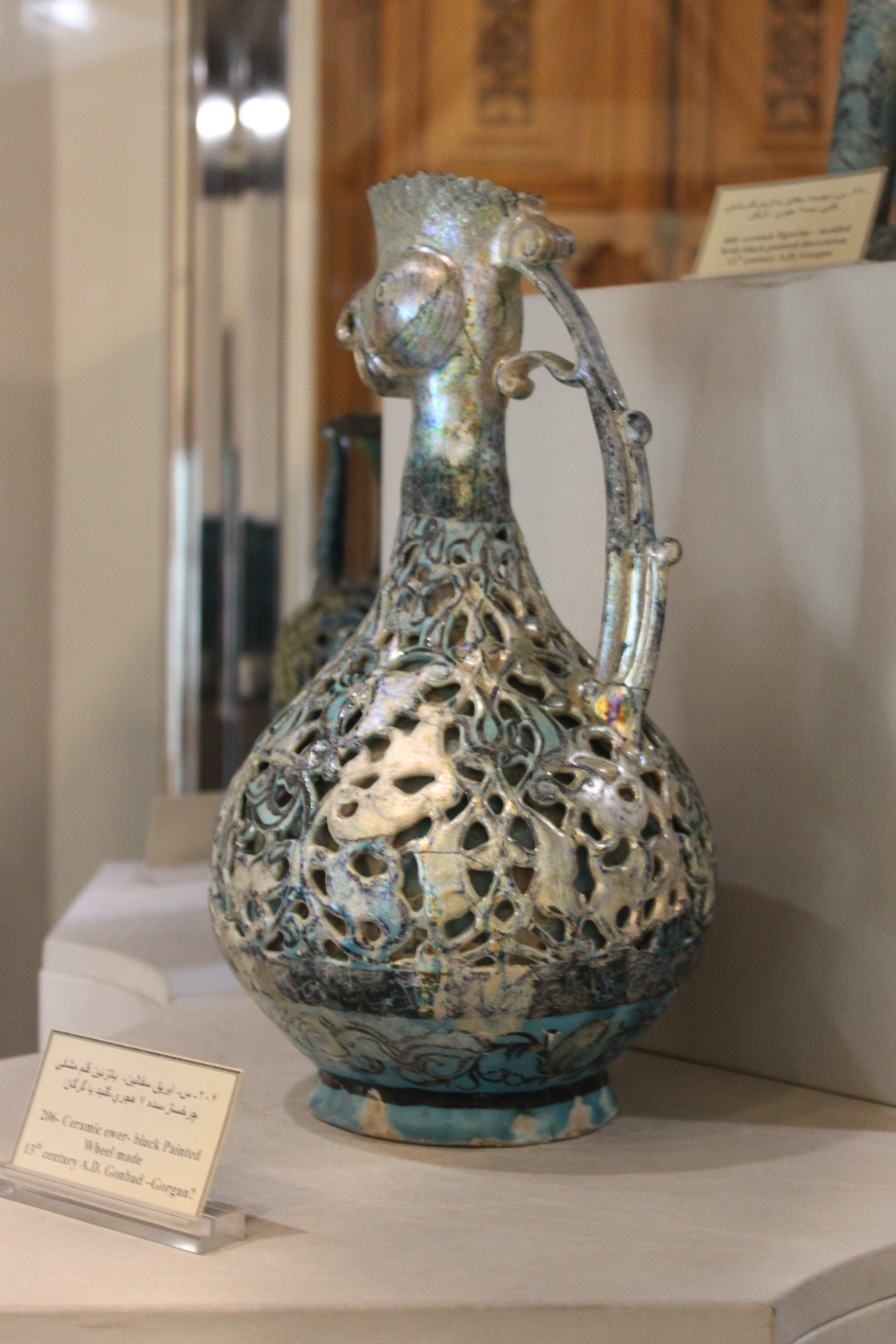
Reticulated ewer, 13th century, Gorgan or Gonbad, Abgineh Museum of Tehran.

It is a reticulated ewer, 40 cm high, made up of two envelopes at the level of the belly: a full envelope and an openwork envelope. The spout is shaped like a rooster's head, with the belly and handle representing its body and tail, respectively.

On the openwork belly, there is a mainly vegetal network, composed of leafy and twisted stems: at the ends of some of these, animal heads and female busts.

There is writing, difficult to read, around the neck and at the base of the body. It could be a poem in praise of wine.

Similar ewers can be seen at the Freer Gallery of Art in Washington and at Abgineh Museum of Tehran (see photograph).

== Context ==
The shape of the ewer can be compared with models found in Chinese ceramics from the time of the Tang dynasty (618-907), which had close relations with Central Asia and Persia. The pieces appear to have been made for a wealthy client.

== Analysis ==
=== Realization of the work ===
The ewer is in siliceous ceramic, with a decoration painted in black, under a transparent turquoise blue glaze. The double belly, which represents a technical challenge, is found in limited numbers on zoomorphic vases, pitchers or ewers from the period. The openwork body is also found on metal objects of the time (animal-shaped incense burners, lamps). The rooster's head of the spout is modeled by hand.

=== Choice of representation ===
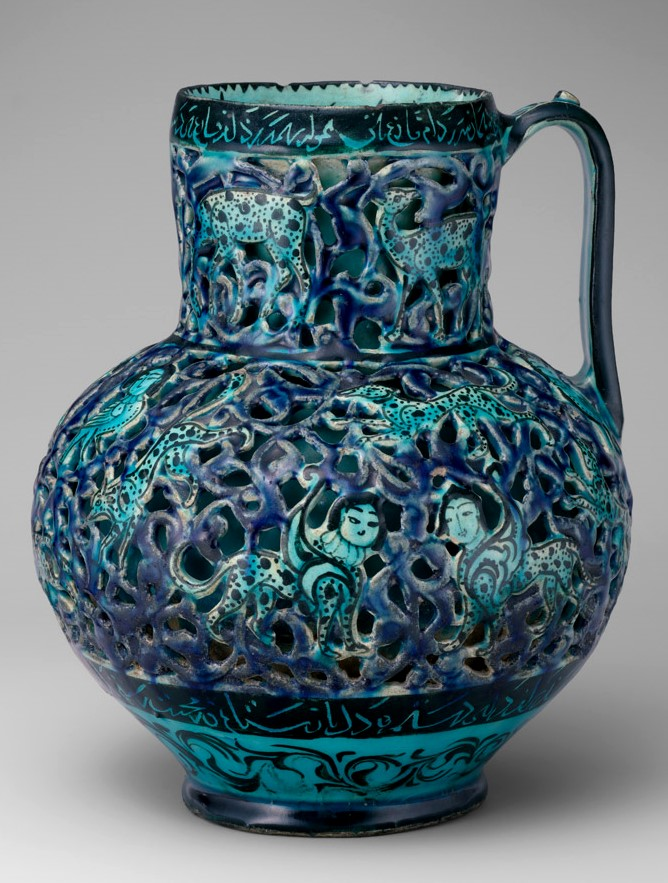
Reticulated jug, 1215, Metropolitan Museum of Art, New York, (Iran, Kachan).

The decoration of the paunch illustrates a myth of Arab origin, the tree of the waq-waq, of which versions of Indian and Chinese origin have also been found. Some define the waq-waq tree as a wonderful tree, located in a distant island, the fruits of which are human heads crying "waq-waq". For Al-Jahiz, in 859 in his Kitāb al-Hayawān (book of animals), the fruits represent animals and whole bodies of women who are suspended by the hair and stop screaming and die when they are picked. This legend is also repeated in the Shahnameh (book of kings) of Ferdowsi where the tree is associated with the quest for knowledge by Iskandar; it is also found in many stories.

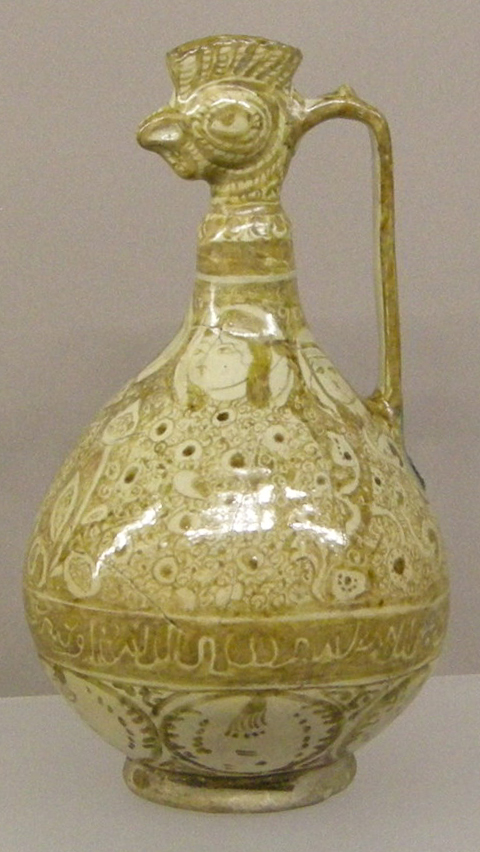
Ewer with rooster's head, late 12th century, early 13th century, Museum of Oriental Art (Turin) (Italy), Kachan.

The rooster theme may have found an echo in ancient Iran where this type of object could be used in rituals. This theme is found in several poems from medieval Iran and in Zoroastrianism, which predated Islam in Iran. In Ferdowsi's Shahnameh, the rooster would have been domesticated by a king, Tahmurath, who would have asked that he be spoken to with kindness. In Islamic culture, the rooster has a heralding role, either by warning of the doomsday or when compared to the muezzin, who awakens believers and invites them to prayer. The eye of the rooster, disproportionately enlarged, could have a protective role.
