= Duck candlestick =

Islamic art piece

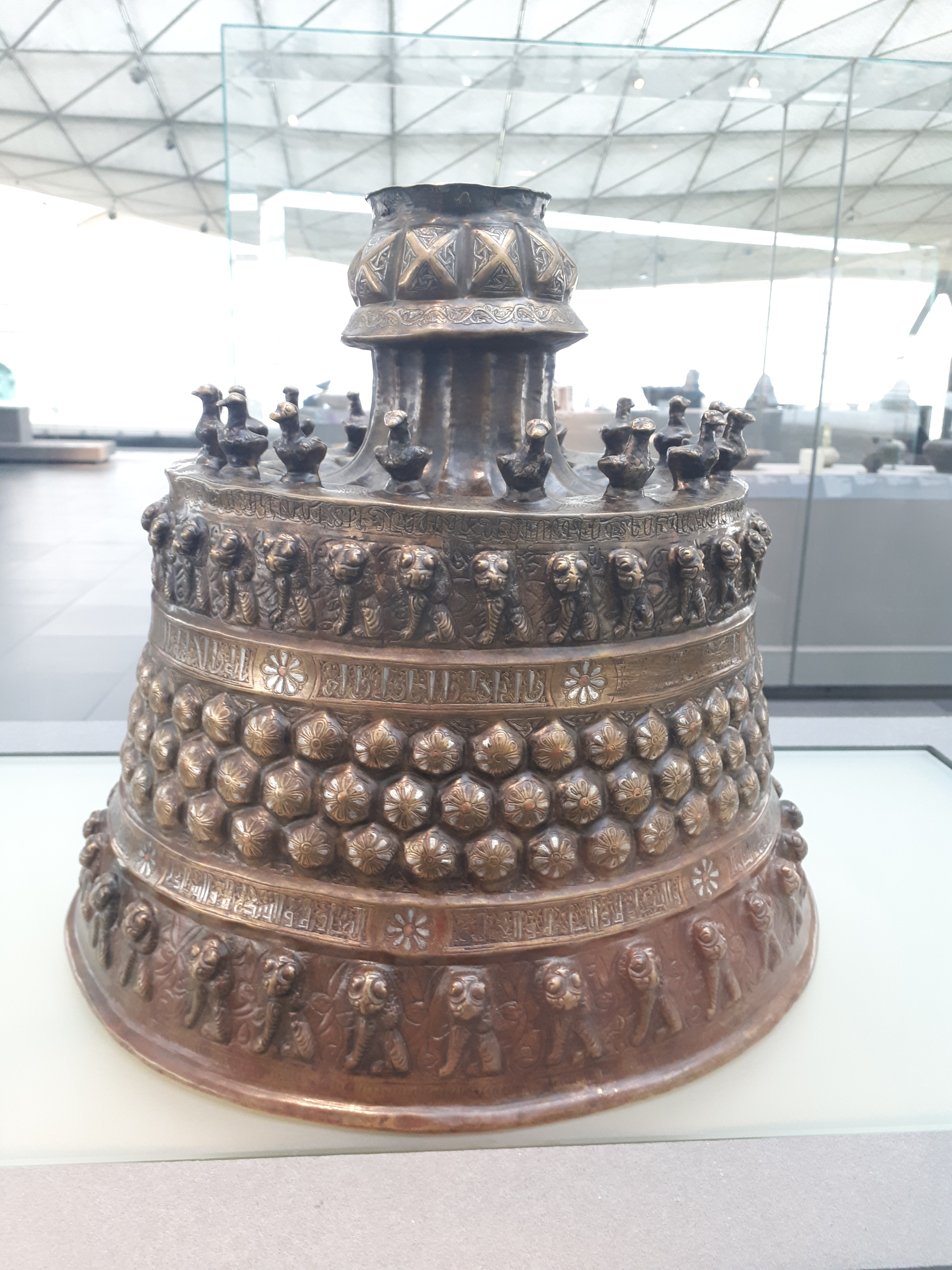

The Duck candlestick, a candelabra with ducks and cats, is an object of Islamic art in hammered and embossed copper alloy, with an inlaid decoration of silver and red copper. It was produced in the medieval Persian world in the 12th century, during the Seljuk and Ghurid eras. It is one of the masterpieces of the Islamic Arts Department of the Louvre Museum.

== History ==
The work bears no identifying information such as date, signature, or place of manufacture. According to a widely held opinion expressed by Annabelle Collinet, the candlestick was probably made in Herat in the second half of the 12th century. A previous study had indicated that, taking into account the decoration of the dimples with solar motifs, frequent in the west of the Iranian world, it was possible that the candlestick had been created in western Persia by an artist originating from Greater Khorasan. Based on similar craftsmanship or decorations, it is possible that the sponsors were dignitaries of the Ghorid dynasty.

An identical candlestick, with which it probably formed a pair, is kept at the Islamic Museum of Cairo; the pair may have been intended to be placed in a monument or an important place. Another, similar but not identical in its method of elaboration (the ducks in the round are not made in repoussé), is in the al-Sabah collection in Kuwait. The work was exhibited in May–June 1903 at the Musée des Arts décoratifs, Paris during the great "exhibition of Muslim arts". It is described as follows in the catalog of the exhibition: "Chandelier decorated with two friezes of small seated lions in embossed relief, separated by a frieze of floral ornaments in relief". In 1699, it belonged to an Armenian owner who offered it to his church.

== Description ==
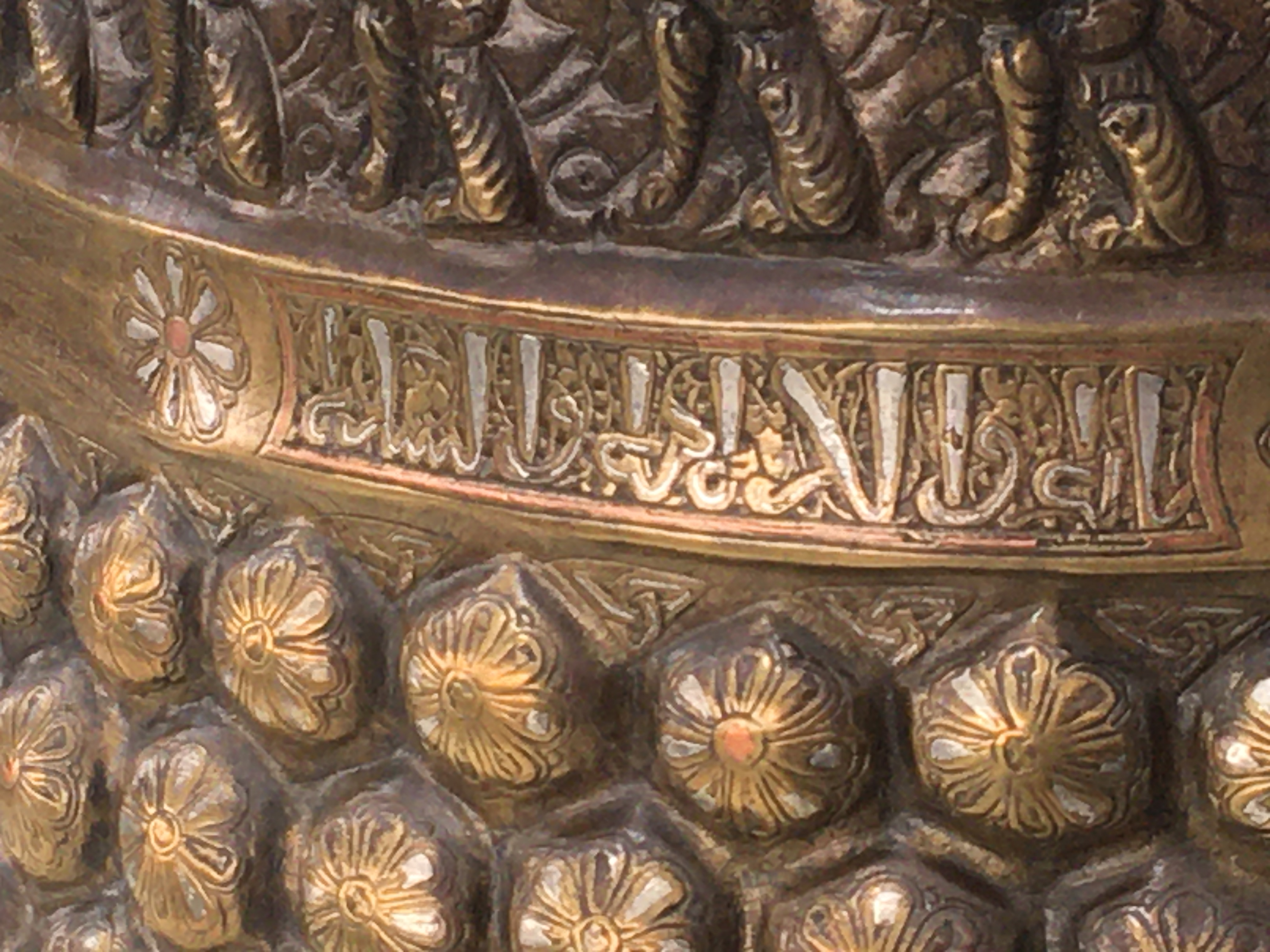
One of the cartouches in cursive writing

Gaston Migeon described the work in 1903 as follows: "It is impossible to forget, had we seen it only once, this extraordinary candlestick, squat in shape, with its crown of birds on the shoulder. In the round, all facing outwards as if ready to take flight, and its two circular friezes, on the body, of seated lions, hieratic, separated by a wide band of bosses. The piece has altogether a character of harshness and incredible majesty."

== Dating ==
The art of embossed and inlaid metal in medieval Persia experienced a notable development from the middle of the 12th century.
