= Freer Canteen =

13th century artifact featuring syncretic motifs

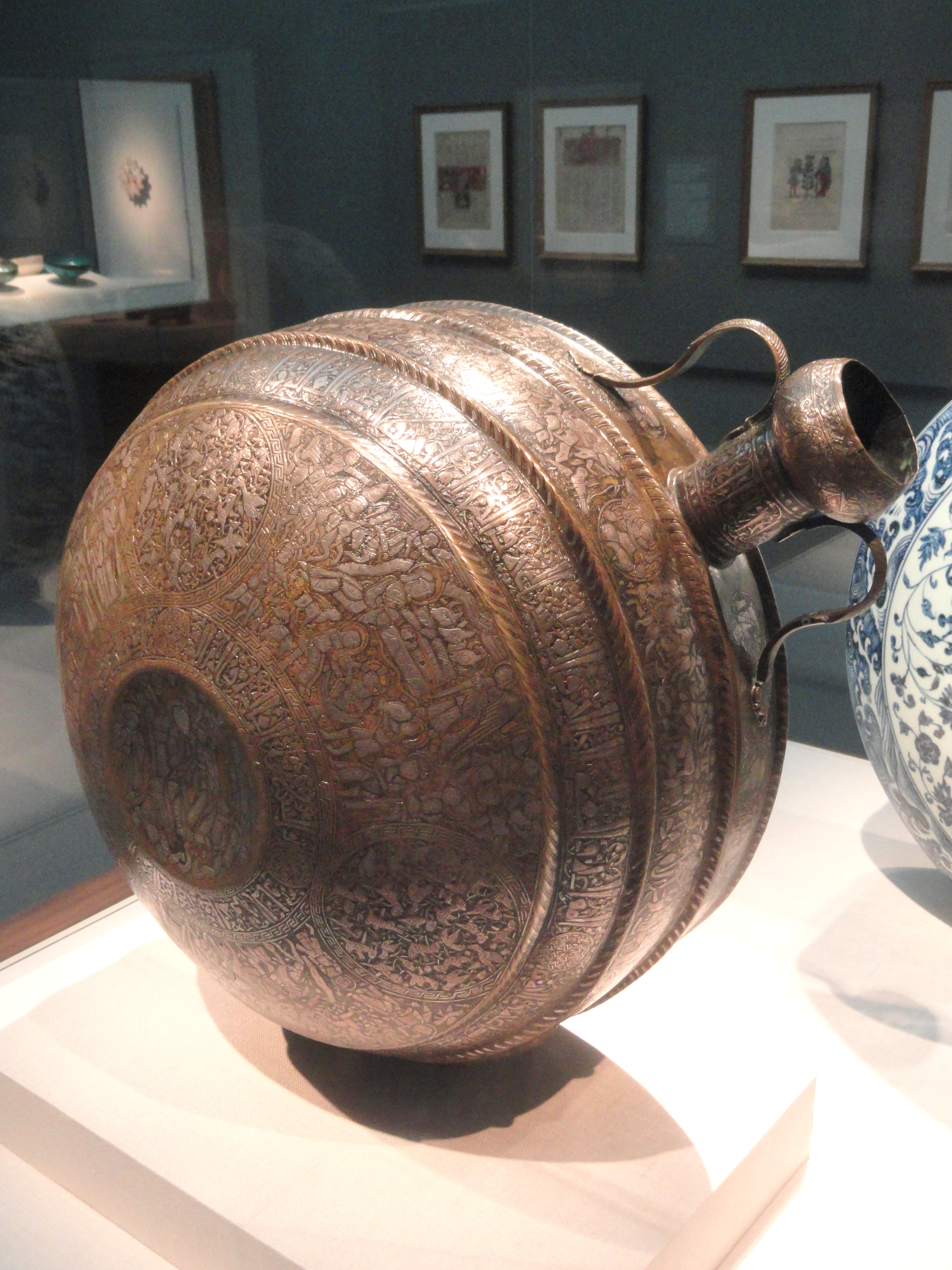
The Freer Canteen, on display in the Freer Gallery of Art.

The Freer Canteen is a brass canteen, inlaid with silver, created in the mid-13th century in Syria or Northern Iraq. It currently resides in the Freer Gallery of Art Collection at the Smithsonian National Museum of Asian Art. The canteen is the largest known example of a brass canteen, and was created in several sections and soldered together. It is notable for its large size and its combination of Christian and Islamic imagery. The silver decorations include Christian scenes, Arabic script, and geometric designs. Historians have debated the canteen’s function due to its unusual size and physical evidence of use. Many scholars have speculated that its unique use of Christian and Islamic elements suggests its commission by a Christian patron and creation by a Muslim artist.

== Subject matter and decorative motifs ==
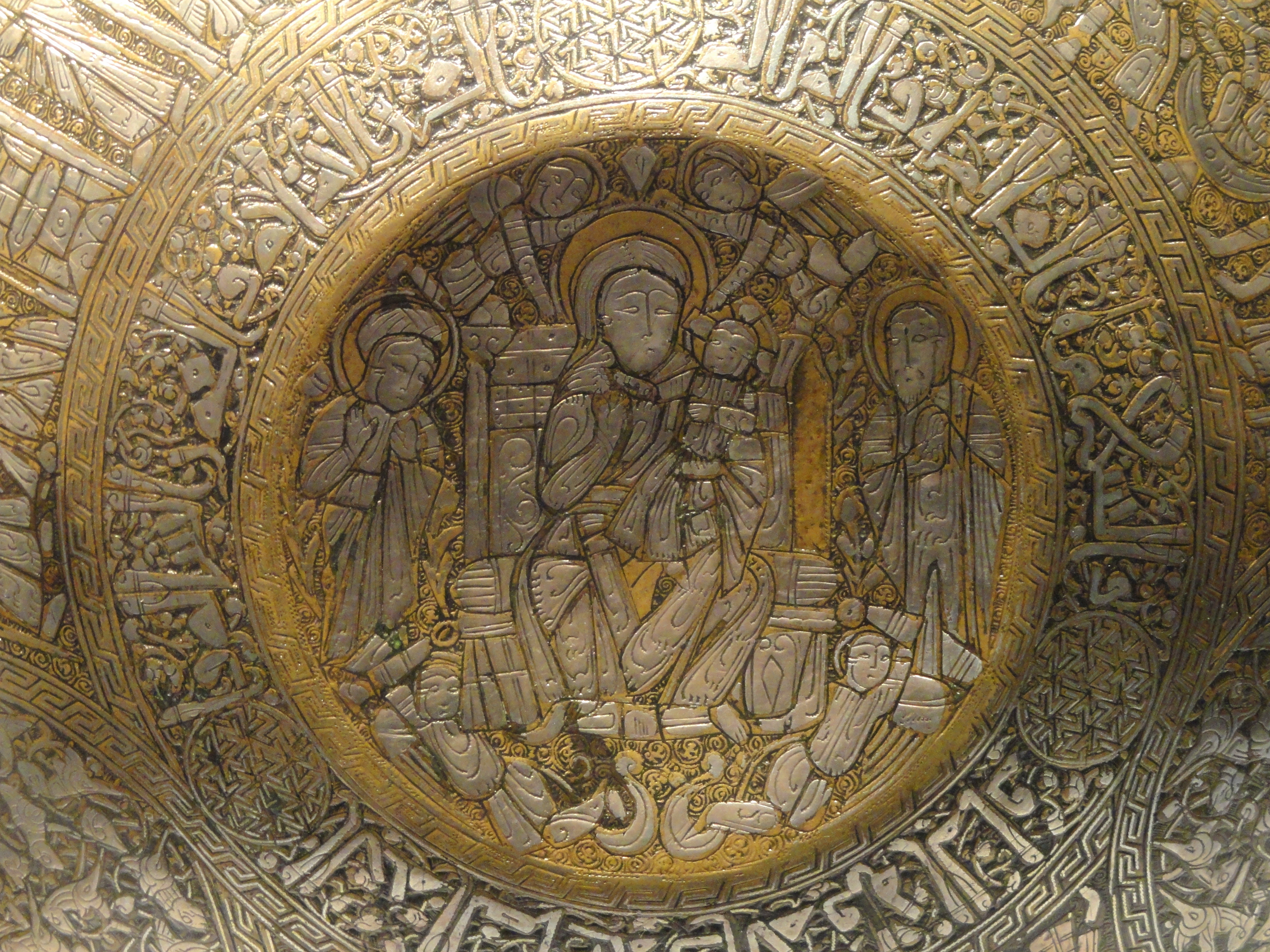
Enthroned Madonna and child, with saints and angels surrounding.

The canteen is a large brass vessel, organized into three concentric fields of figural, vegetal, and calligraphic ornament. The central medallion depicts the enthroned Madonna and child with two saints on either side and angels filling the remaining space in the circle. Inscriptions in Arabic in both Kufic and Naskhi script enclose the medallion. In the outermost field, three roundels separate panels that portray scenes from the Bible’s depiction of the life of Christ: The Nativity, the Presentation in the Temple, and the Entry into Jerusalem. The roundels bear geometric floral motifs, birds, and the torsos of harpies, griffins, and lions. The back of the canteen has a conical socket in the center and two registers of figures radiating outwards. The band around the conical socket depicts nine horsemen carrying lances, possibly participating in a tournament. The outward band presents twenty-five figures under arches supported by columns, which serve as a separation device for the depictions of saints, warriors, Gabriel, and Mary. The neck on this side of the canteen also displays a Nashki inscription.

== Manufacturing technique and material composition ==
The Freer Canteen is an engraved, hammered brass vessel inlaid with silver. Metal objects inlaid with another metal was a technique that was only recorded being practiced after the 12th century within Islamic art; the canteen was an earlier example of this technique. It is 14 ½ inches wide with a depth of 8 ½ inches, and the spout is 3 ½ inches long. It weighs 10 pounds empty, indicating it was likely for decorative instead of practical purposes. The shape of the canteen is unusual compared to other examples of 13th-century Islamic metalwork and is similar to the shape of ceramic pilgrim flasks, which are characterized by a wide vessel with two rounded handles along the sides of the spout. The handles were likely a later addition to the canteen. The visual similarity of the canteen is another connection to Christianity, alongside the figural representation on the canteen. Details on the canteen are similar to manuscript illumination, such as the use of “scroll folds” on the clothing of figures in all of its scenes.

== Historical context ==
The Freer Canteen was produced in the mid-13th century during the Ayyubid period (1171 to 1250 CE), likely in Syria or northern Iraq. The Freer Canteen is often associated with the northern Iraqi "Mosul School" tradition of metalwork. While no individual artist is recorded, the style connects the canteen to the renowned metal-inlay tradition of the Mosul area, known for technical achievements such as spinning brass discs, soldering sections, and performing fine inlay work. Scholars suggest the canteen may have been crafted for a wealthy Christian patron or a Muslim patron familiar with Christian imagery, possibly to commemorate a pilgrimage or a high-status occasion perhaps related to travel, given the canteen's form. Some of the previous owners were Prince Filippo Andrea Doria, George Aristedes Eumorfopoulos, and Hagop Kevorkian. Consequently, the canteen shows the blending of Christian iconography and Islamic luxury metalwork in a 13th-century west Asian context.

== Reception ==
The unique aspects of the Freer Canteen, such as its size and subject matter, have led to debate amongst scholars regarding its function and patronage. Some historians argue that due to the incongruences in the Christian scenes, the canteen may have been commissioned by a Christian and created by a Muslim, who would have had less knowledge of specific Bible scenes. Due to its hybrid nature, the piece has been frequently studied and featured as an important depiction of cross-cultural exchange between Christians and Muslims. The canteen has been housed in the Freer Gallery of Art since 1941, after it was purchased from art collector Hagop Kevorkian. It is on display in the Smithsonian Museum.
