= History of metallurgy in Mosul =

From the 13th century

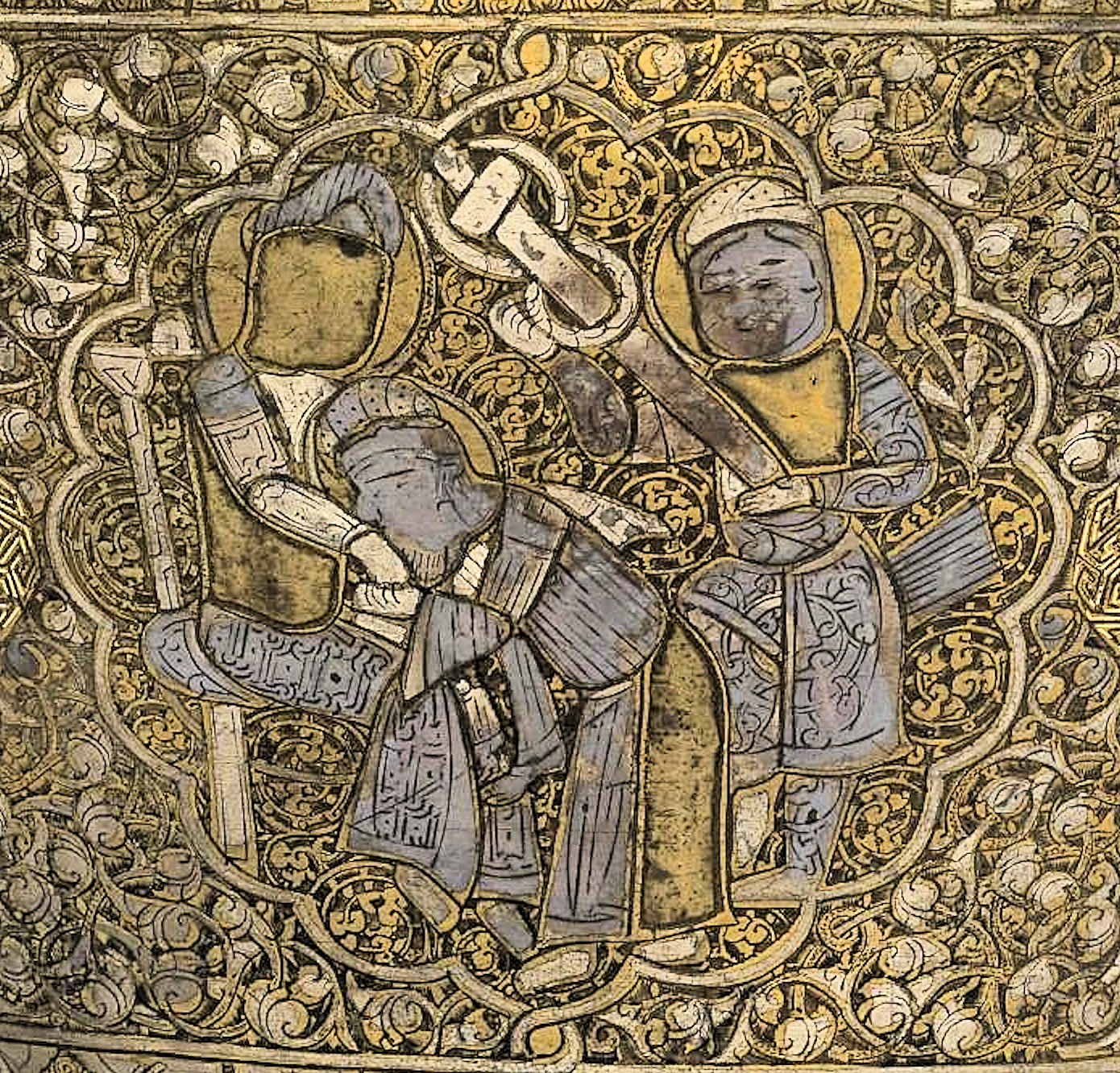
Enthronement scene on an ewer. Mosul, dated 1246 from Mosul: a man in turban kissing the hand of the ruler with sharbush headgear, probably Badr al-Din Lu'lu'.

During the thirteenth century, Mosul, Iraq became home to a school of luxury metalwork which rose to international renown. Artifacts classified as Mosul are some of the most intricately designed and revered pieces of the Middle Ages.

== Background ==
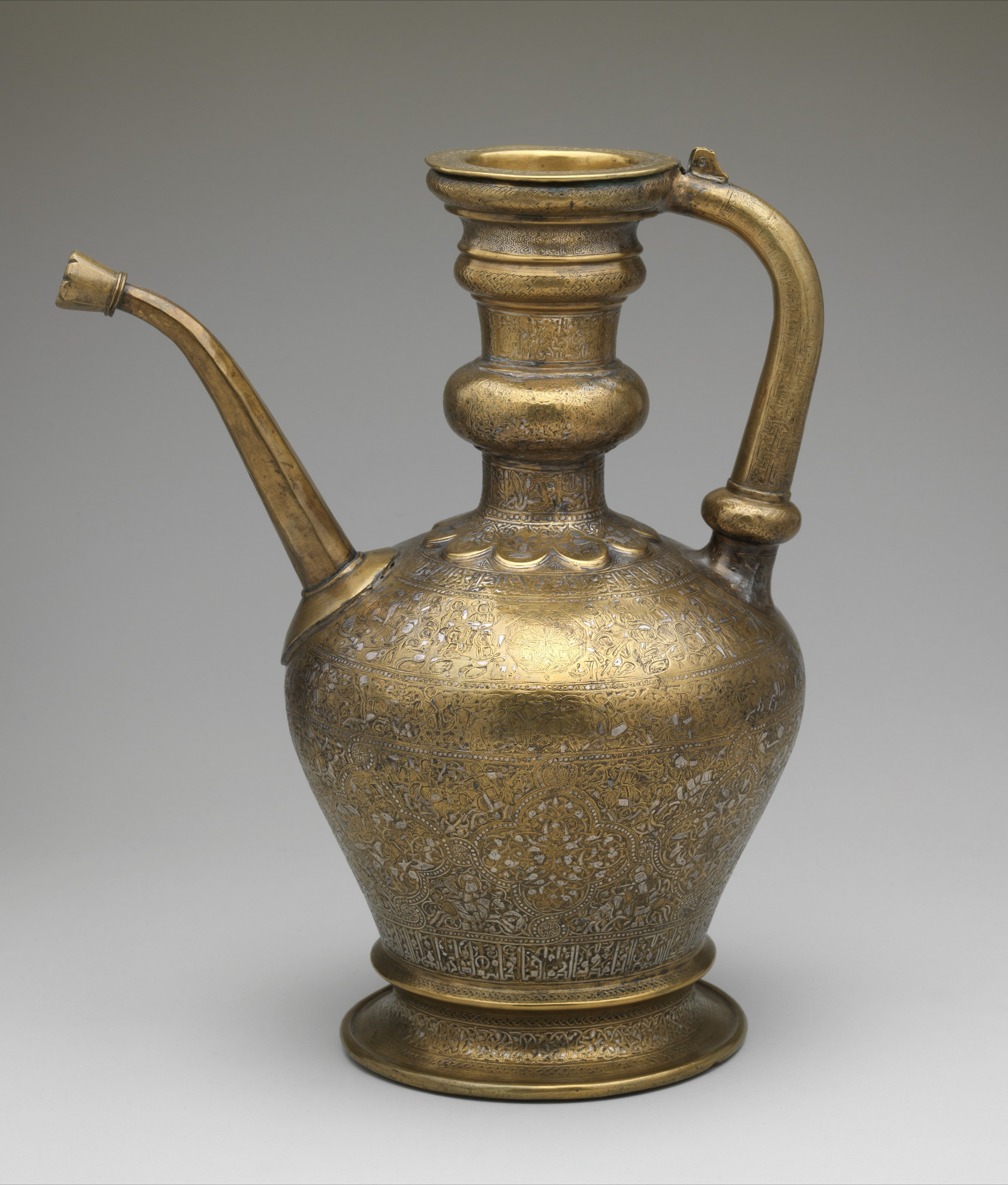
Ewer with inscription, probably Mosul, dated 1226.

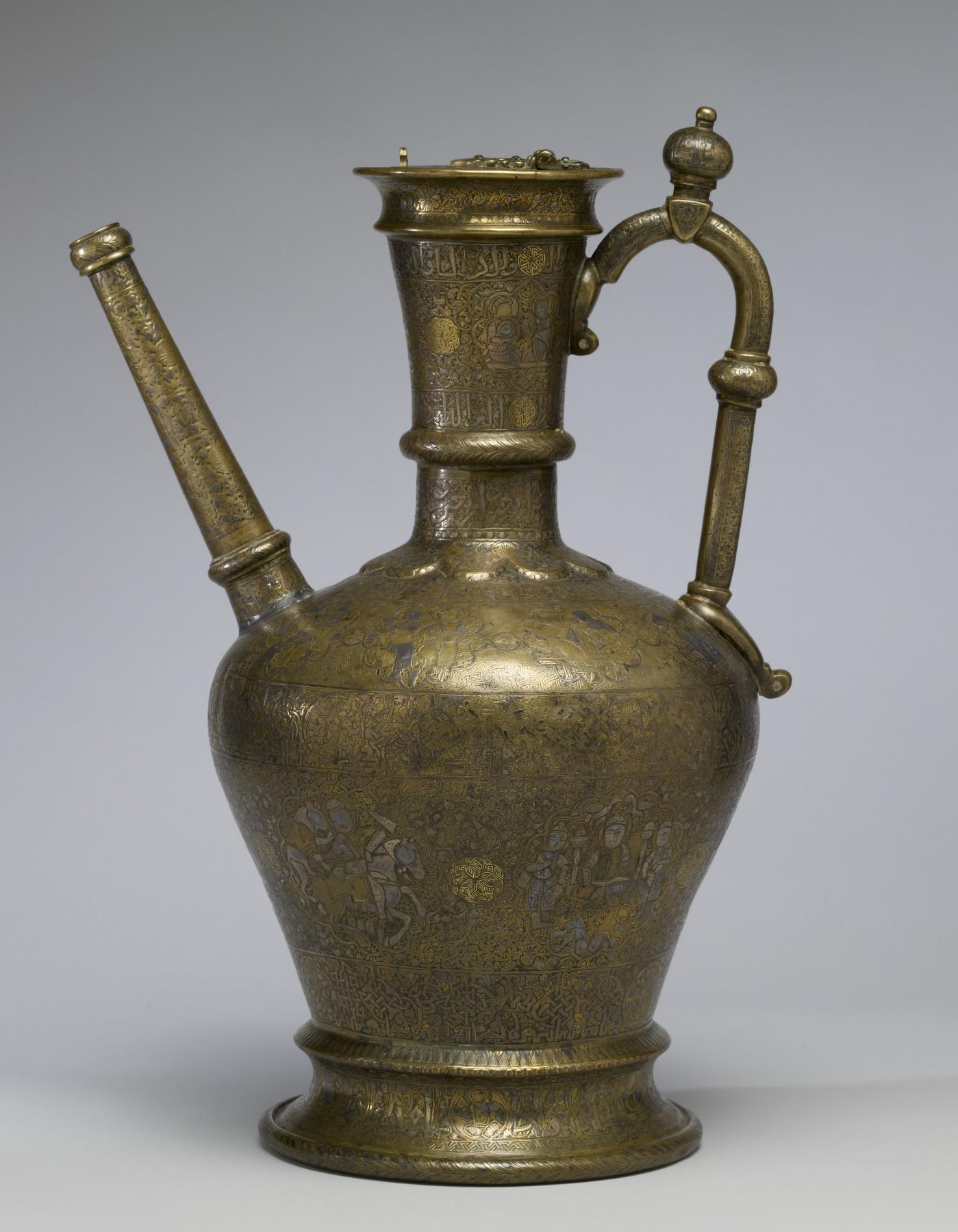
Mosul Ewer

The school of metalwork in Mosul is believed to have been founded in the early 13th century under Zengid patronage. During this time, the Zengid region was operating as a vassal under the Ayyubid Sultanate. Control over Mosul as a city central to trade between China, the Mediterranean, Anatolia, and Mesopotamia was contested between the Zengids and the Ayyubid sultan, Saladin, throughout the early acquisitions of the Ayyubid Sultanate in Syria and Iraq after the decline of Fatimid rule. However, the Zengids remained in Mosul and were allowed some degree of authority under the Sultanate.

Around 1256, the Mongol occupation of Iraq began, and the region became a part of the Ilkhanate. Of the artifacts agreed to be "nabish al-Mawsili" (of Mosul), approximately 80% were produced after the commencement of Mongol rule in Mosul. However, it is unclear as to whether or not all of these artifacts were produced within Mosul and later exported as esteemed gifts, or created elsewhere by Mosulian artisans who relocated but maintained the "al-Mawsili" signature.

== Design ==
The process of creating these luxuriously inlaid objects is somewhat complicated and has multiple stages. First, designs are formed on the surface of the metal (usually copper or brass) by relief, piercing, engraving, or chasing. Color is then added to the crevices of the surface by encrustation, overlay or, most commonly, inlay of precious metals. These metal inlays could be sheets or wires hammered into place. The area around the inlaid design was often roughened or covered with some sort of black material. Each craftsman in the industry had their own personal specialization. This specialization could be in a particular metal, technique, object, or step in the process. There are two reasons the casting step of the process usually took place in an urban workshop. The first is simply because most patrons were located in these urban areas. The second is because it would be too difficult to move all of the heavy equipment necessary for casting from one rural location to the next. Inlayers and precious metalworkers were able to travel with ease and were not confined to the workshops as casters were. There were three main inlay innovations that are believed to have originated in Mosul in the thirteenth century- gold inlays, black inlay, and background scrolls inlaid with silver.

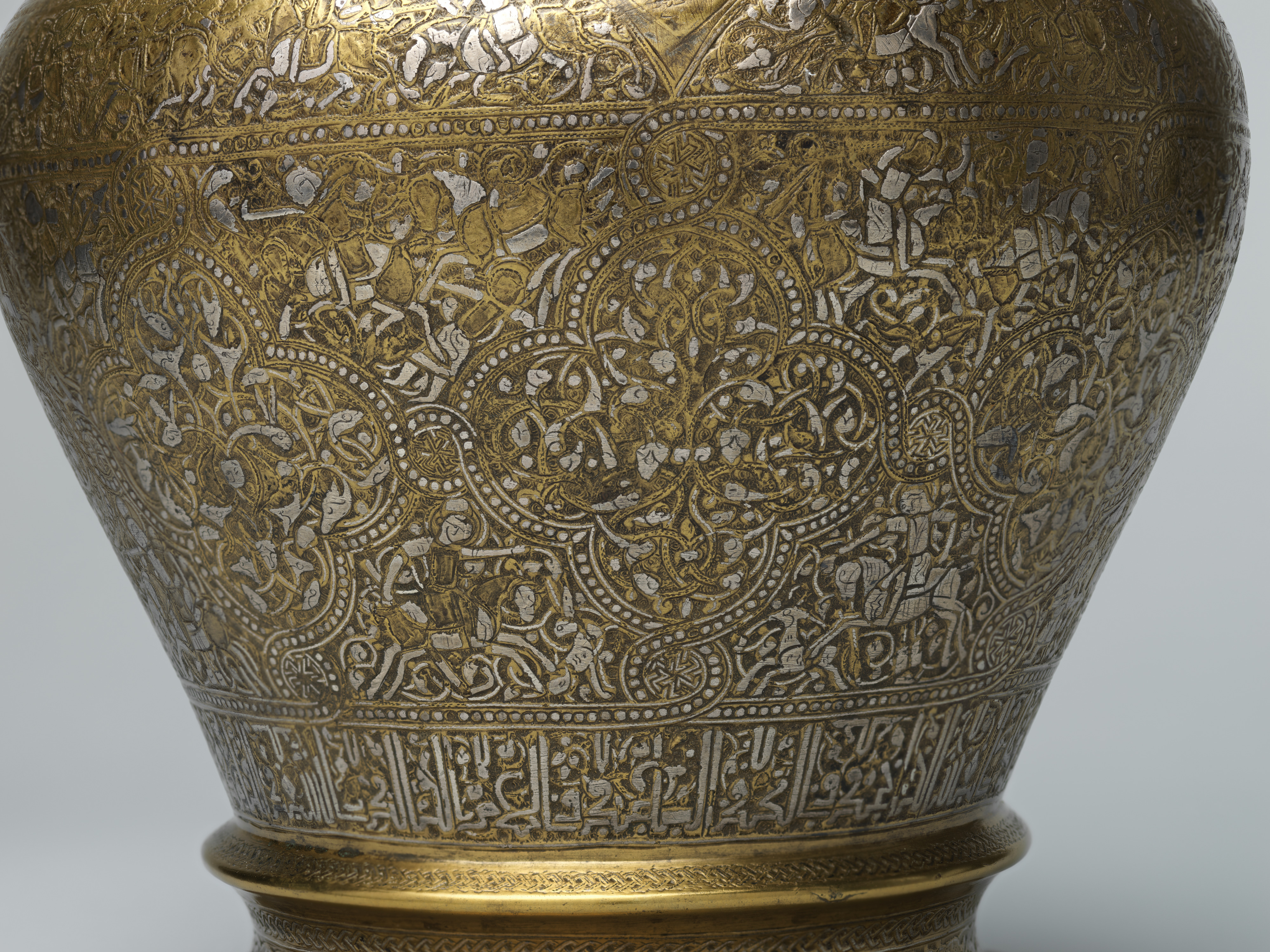
Close-up of intricate designs on Ewer

The designs themselves are quite varied in subject matter. Some of the popular motifs include: astrology, hunting, enthronements, battles, court life, and genre scenes. Genre scenes, images of everyday life are particularly prominent. Among the original design traditions there is evidence that can trace them to East Asia through the designs within textiles. Mosul was a great textile industry during the same period that they were producing these inlaid objects and they happened to specialize in reproductions of Chinese silks. It is speculated that many of the traditional metalwork designs were heavily influenced or even direct copies of these silk reproductions.

Historically, many scholars have argued that the Mongol sack of Mosul led to the demise of the luxury metalworking industry, however modern scholarship and an abundance of evidence disproves this. For example, it is known that Mosul metalworkers received an imperial commission by Il-Khan Abu Sa'id in the last years of the Ilkanate. Not only did Mosul continue to produce elaborate inlaid objects after the Mongol sack, they also altered their traditional stylistic choices to coalesce with Mongol taste. There was a new emphasis on minuscule style, the figures represented reflect the Ilkanhid fashion of the period, and they started to put more emphasis on pattern over figuration.

One of the finest examples of the Mosul school of metalworking is the Blacas Ewer.

Another item tentatively attributed to Mosul is the Courtauld bag, which is thought to be the world's oldest surviving handbag.

== Scholarship ==
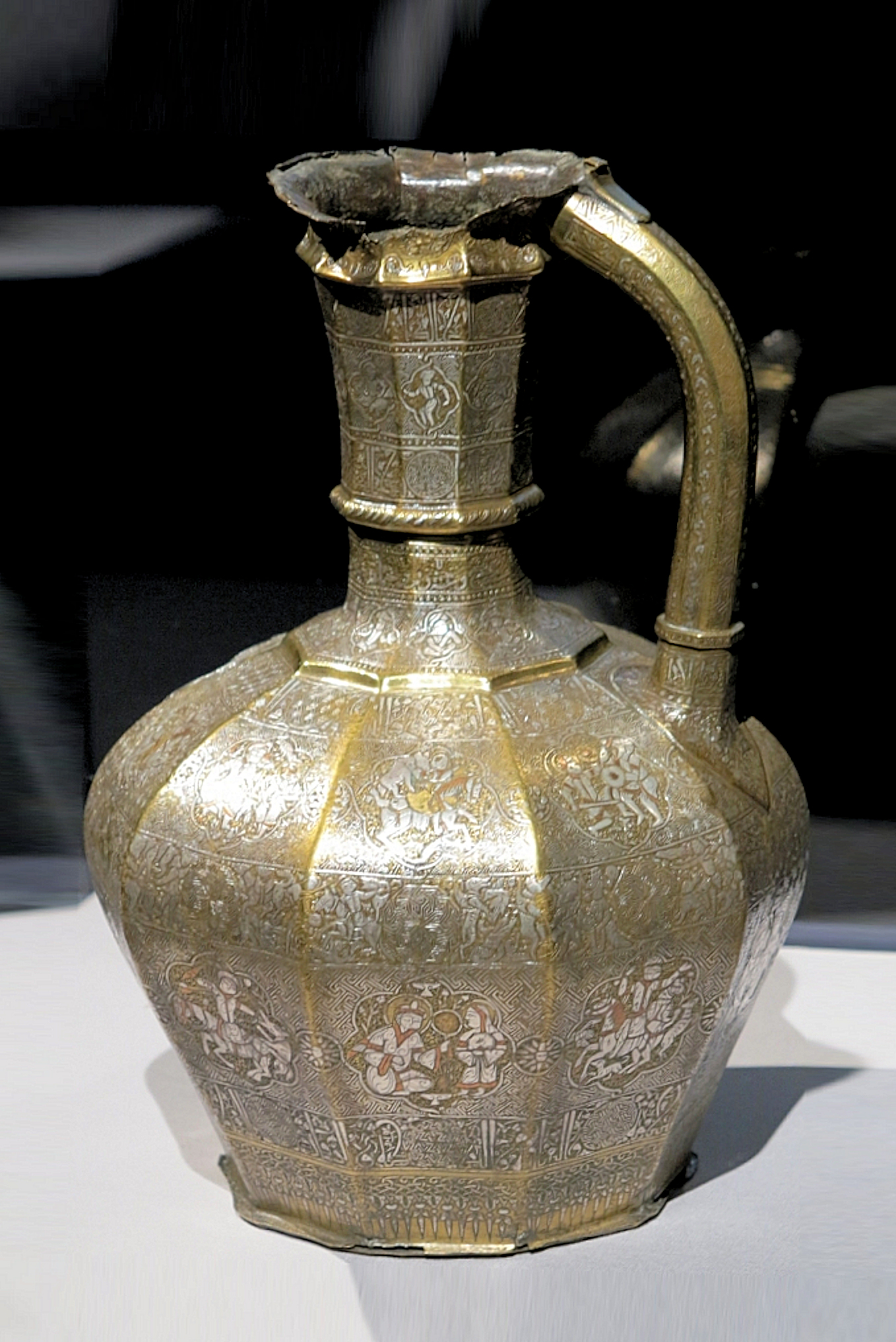
The Blacas ewer, made by Shuja' ibn Man'a in Mosul in 1232, is one of the most famous brass pieces from Mosul.

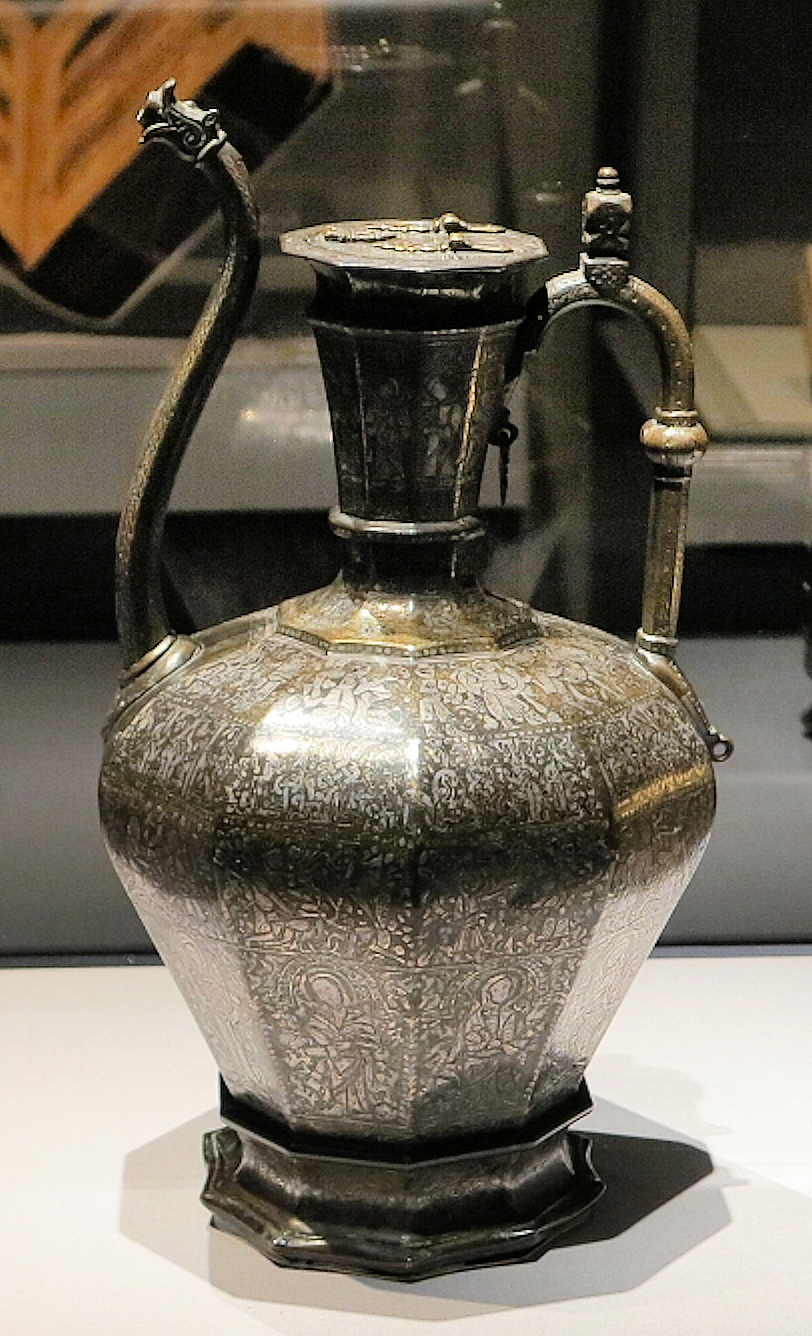
Homberg ewer. Inlaid Brass with Christian Iconography. Probably Mosul, dated 1242–43.

The scholarship surrounding Mosul Metalwork has been ongoing for a very long time, since it became the first Islamic objects d'art studied in Europe, due to its early arrival on the continent. The diverse opinions on what constitutes as Mosul Metalwork arise due to the style's dispersion across lands and through the component of signatures which identify creators as "al Mawsili", meaning "of Mosul". Within the section of metalwork with signatures, twenty-seven out of the thirty-five state themselves as "al- Mawsili". Out of those, eight state their provenance through the name of the people for which they were created along with statements declaring their engendering within Mosul. Some notable scholars that have helped shape the basis of this study include: Joseph Toussaint Reinaud, Henri Lavoix, Gaston Migeon, Max Van Berchem, Mehmed Aga-Oglu, David Storm Rice.

In the early years of Mosul Metalwork, around 1828, Joseph Toussaint Reinaud, published a collection that included the first item to clearly state its creation in Mosul, the 'Blacas ewer', an artifact consistently scrutinized by scholars when exploring Mosul style. Then in the 1860s the credibility of Mosul was being questioned by scholars, it was during that century that Henry Lavoix declared that Damascus, Aleppo, Mosul, and Egypt all created inlaid metalwork, but specifically singled out Mosul as a source for a unique style unseen throughout the medium.

A critical point in the scholarship came in the beginning of the 20th, through Gaston Migeon, whose claims over the precedency of Mosul caused objection and an urgency for reliability. Migeon also wrote the first comprehensive article introducing the inlaid Islamic metalwork. In the following years, the fluctuation of precedence of Mosul and the lack of it continued, leading up to David Storm Rice, who released the first series of articles exploring the complexities of multiple objects, a process similar to that of Max Van Brehmen and Mehmed Aga-Oglu, two scholars that impacted the relevance and viability of Mosul Metalwork, some of which included the Blacas Ewer, Louvre basin and the Munich Tray.

Present day, Mosul Metalwork is still elusive, and lacks a sustaining amount of scholarship, but scholars continue to construct a field that utilizes substantiated evidence through designs, inscription, and other items engendered specifically in Mosul around the 13th century. An example of this is represented in an article written by Ruba Kana' An who utilizes its iconography and description to construct the argument stating the Freer Ewer as one of many metalworks constructed in Mosul.

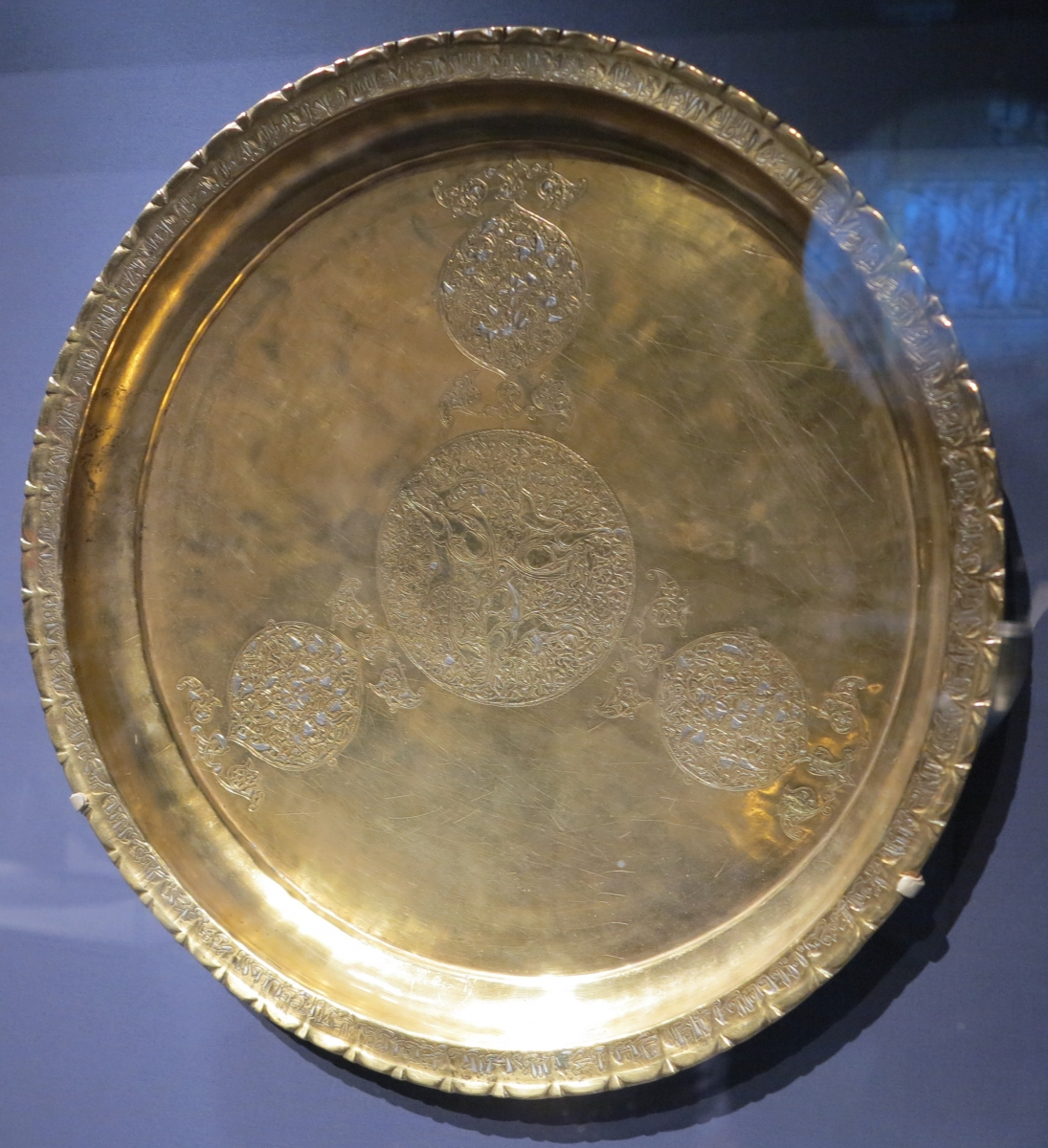
Inlaid brass tray of Badr al-Din Lu'lu'. Mosul, 13th cen. V&A

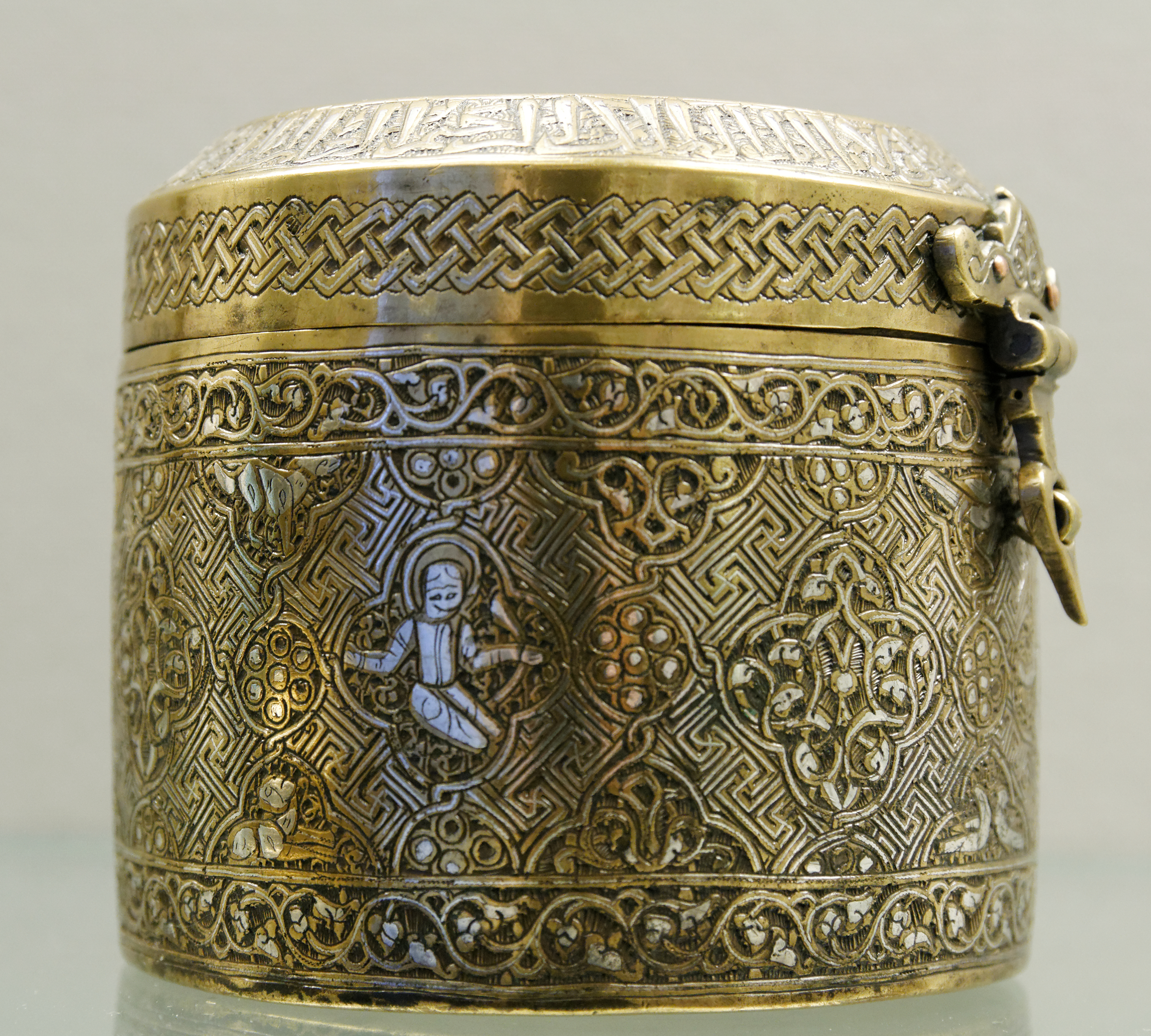
Cylindrical lidded box with an Arabic inscription recording its manufacture for the ruler of Mosul, Badr al-Din Lu'lu

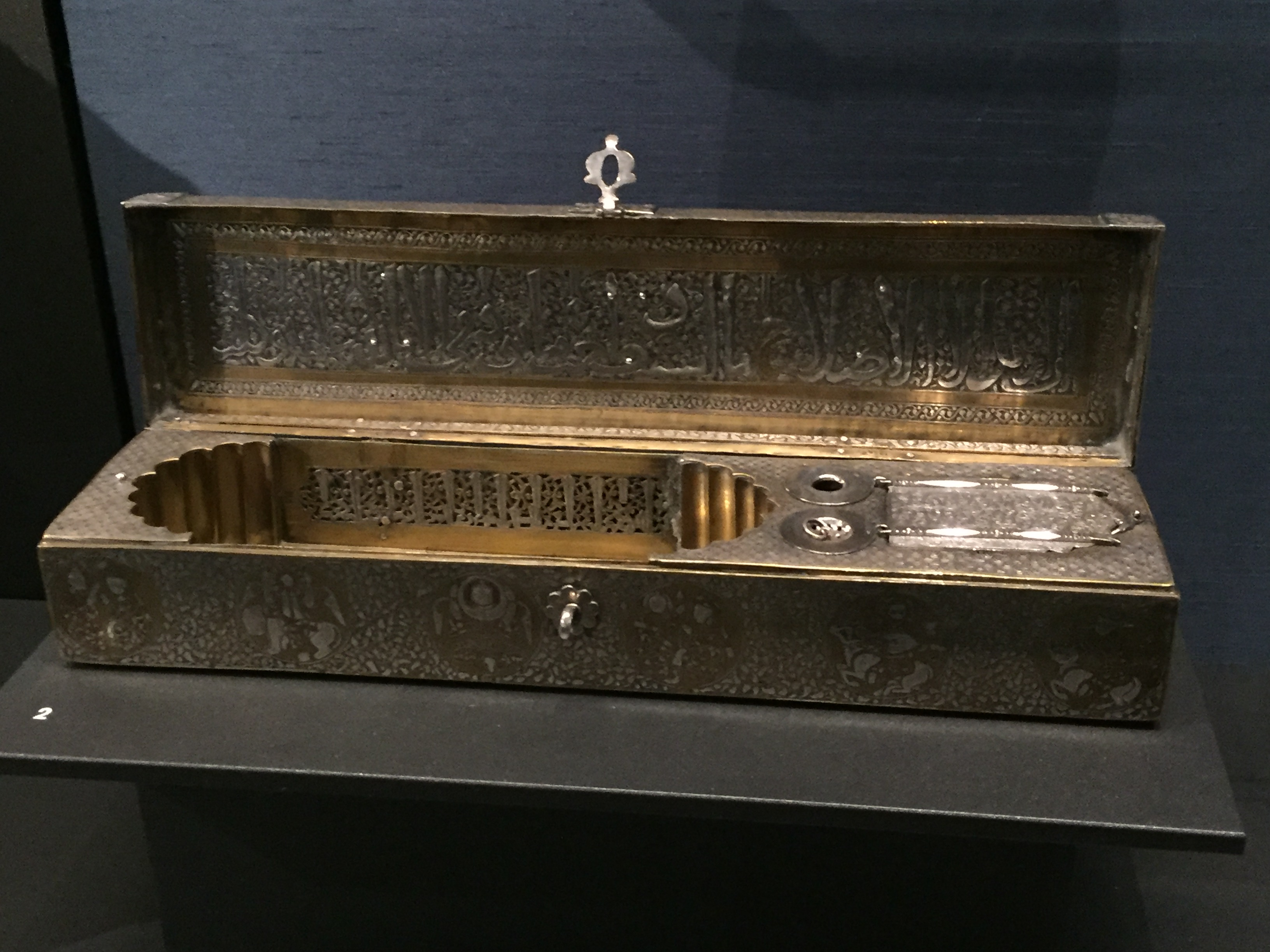
Pen-box, 1230-1250, Mosul. British Museum

== See also ==
- Timeline of materials technology
- Nonferrous archaeometallurgy of the Southern Levant
- History of metallurgy in the Indian subcontinent
