= Blacas ewer =

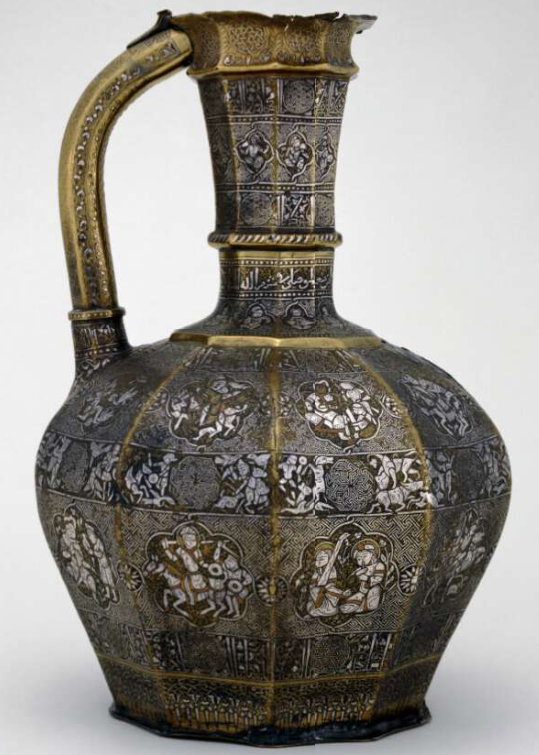
Image of the Blacas ewer

The Blacas ewer is a brass ewer, inlaid with silver and copper, made by an esteemed man, Shuja' ibn Man'a al-Mawsili in Mosul in April or May 1232 (Rajab, 629 AH). One of the most important and well-known pieces of metalwork from Mosul, it was likely commissioned for Badr al-Din Lu'lu', who was already the de facto ruler of Mosul when the ewer was made and who officially became ruler one year later. Until 1997, the Blacas ewer was the only known piece of metalwork with an inscription explicitly saying it was made in Mosul. Because of this inscription, it forms one of the core items of the contested "Mosul School" of metalwork, since its Mosuli provenance is undisputed.

== Part of an antiquarian's collection ==
The Blacas ewer is the only known work by Shuja' ibn Man'a. It formed the part of the personal collection of the French antiquarian Pierre Louis Jean Casimir de Blacas, which was published in 1828. It is now on display at the British Museum in London, which has owned it since 1866.

== Depictions of hunting, sports, and feasts ==
The Blacas Ewer is missing its foot and spout, but it doesn’t take away from the beautiful designs, structure, and origins of the ewer. It is decorated with a geometric fretwork background punctuated by several small and large multi-lobed medallions. Inside the medallions are figural scenes depicting a wide variety of courtly activities: hunting, sports, and feasts with music and dance. There are also literary scenes, such as a depiction of Bahram Gur hunting on camelback while Azadeh plays the harp by his side—a story from the Shahnama.

== Depictions of high-ranking women ==
Several scenes depict "women of high social rank": for example, one scene depicts a woman riding a camel, another depicts a veiled woman playing the lute, and another shows a woman sitting cross-legged while admiring herself in the mirror.

== Chinese stylistic influences ==
The overall design composition is reminiscent of Chinese textiles, which may have served as an inspiration. In this case, though, the design is interrupted by an octagonal symbol filled with geometric patterns, which may have been a brand mark or guild emblem.

== Lifestyle of the wealthy and powerful ==
The scenes illustrated on the ewer depict contemporary life of the wealthy and powerful, likely reflecting the high status of its original owner.

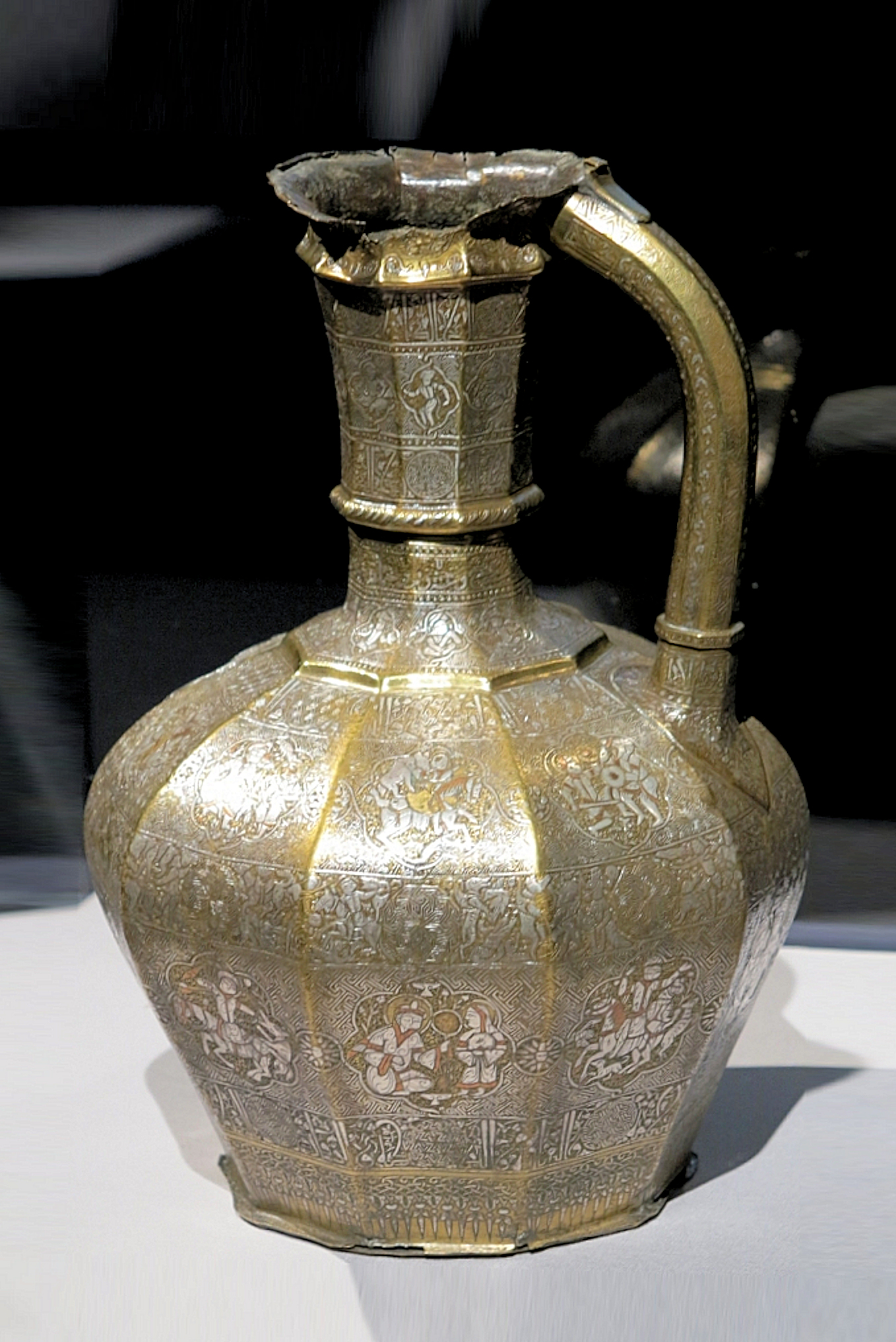
Blacas Ewer, Mosul, 1232, British Museum.

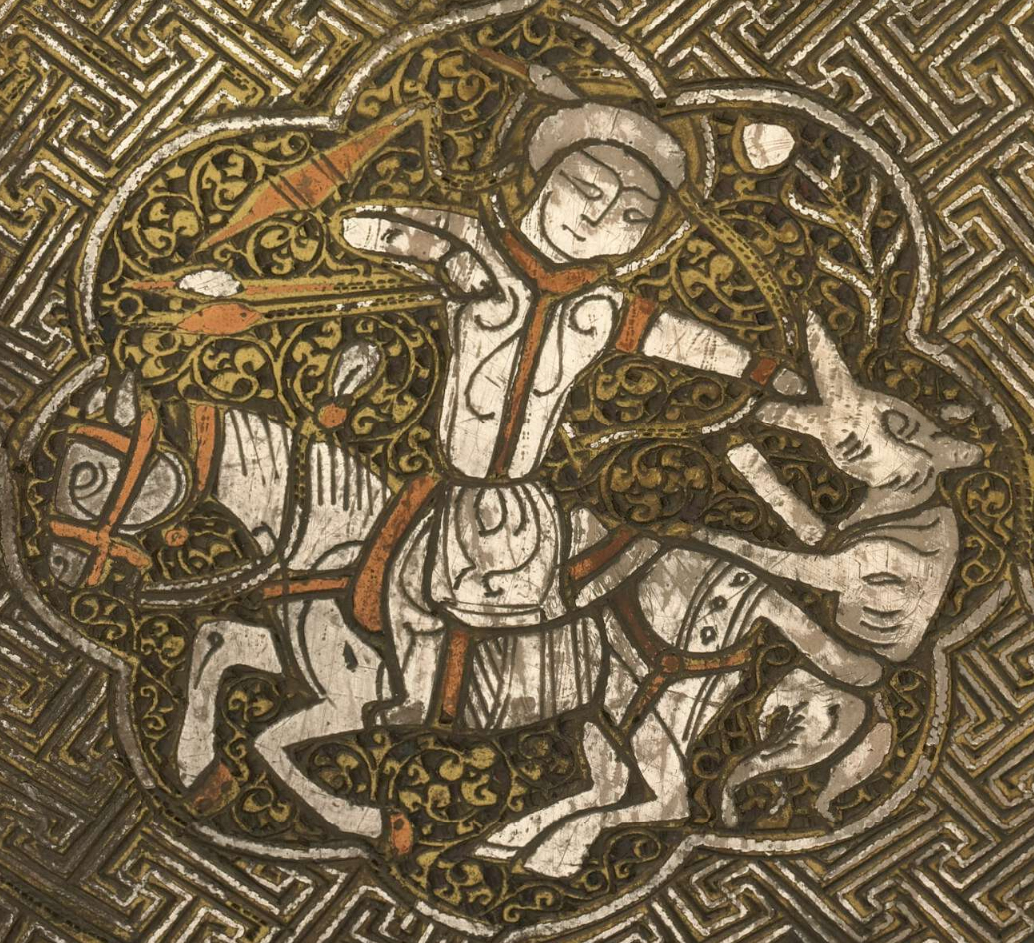
Hunting scene on the Blacas ewer, 1232, Mosul, Zengid dynasty.

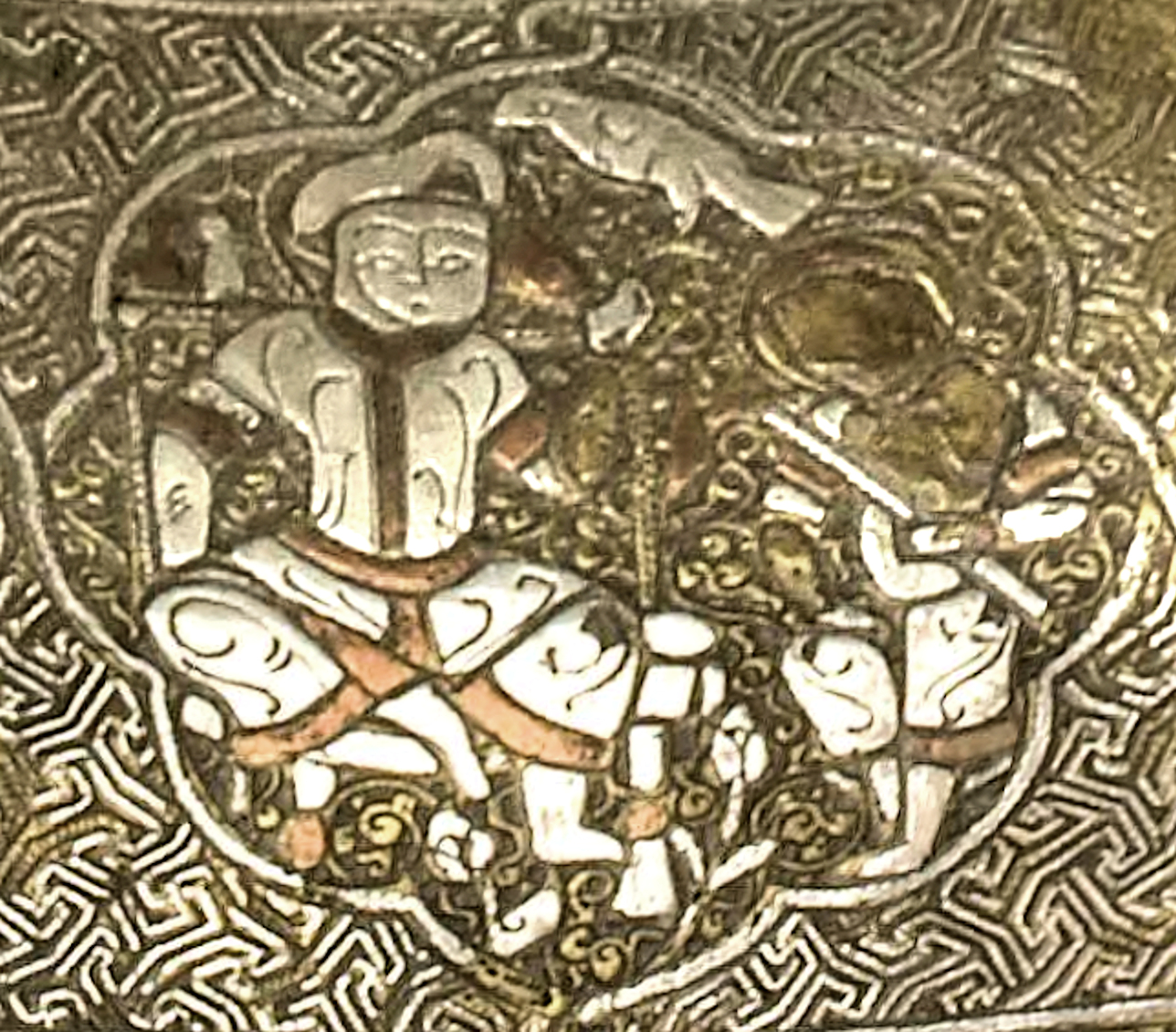
Regnal scene on the Blacas ewer, 1232, Mosul, Zengid dynasty.

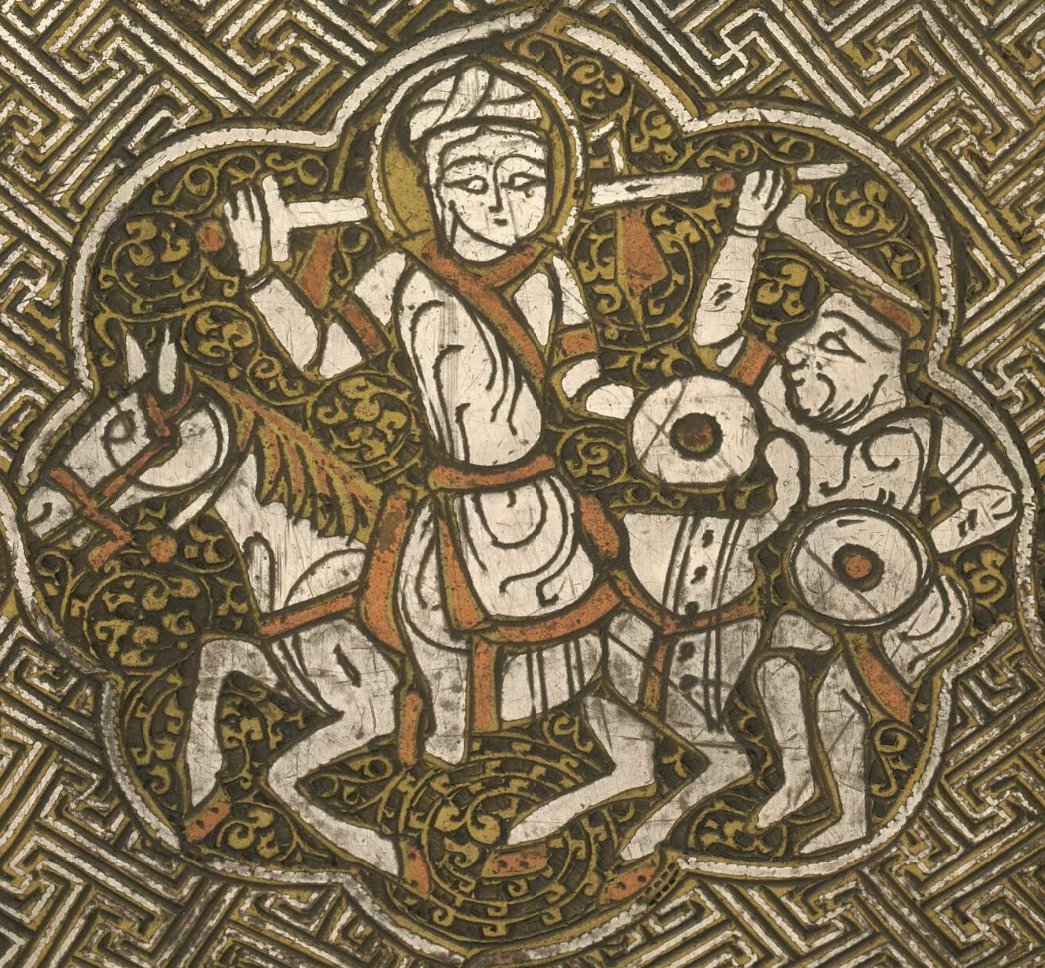
Blacas ewer, combat scene.

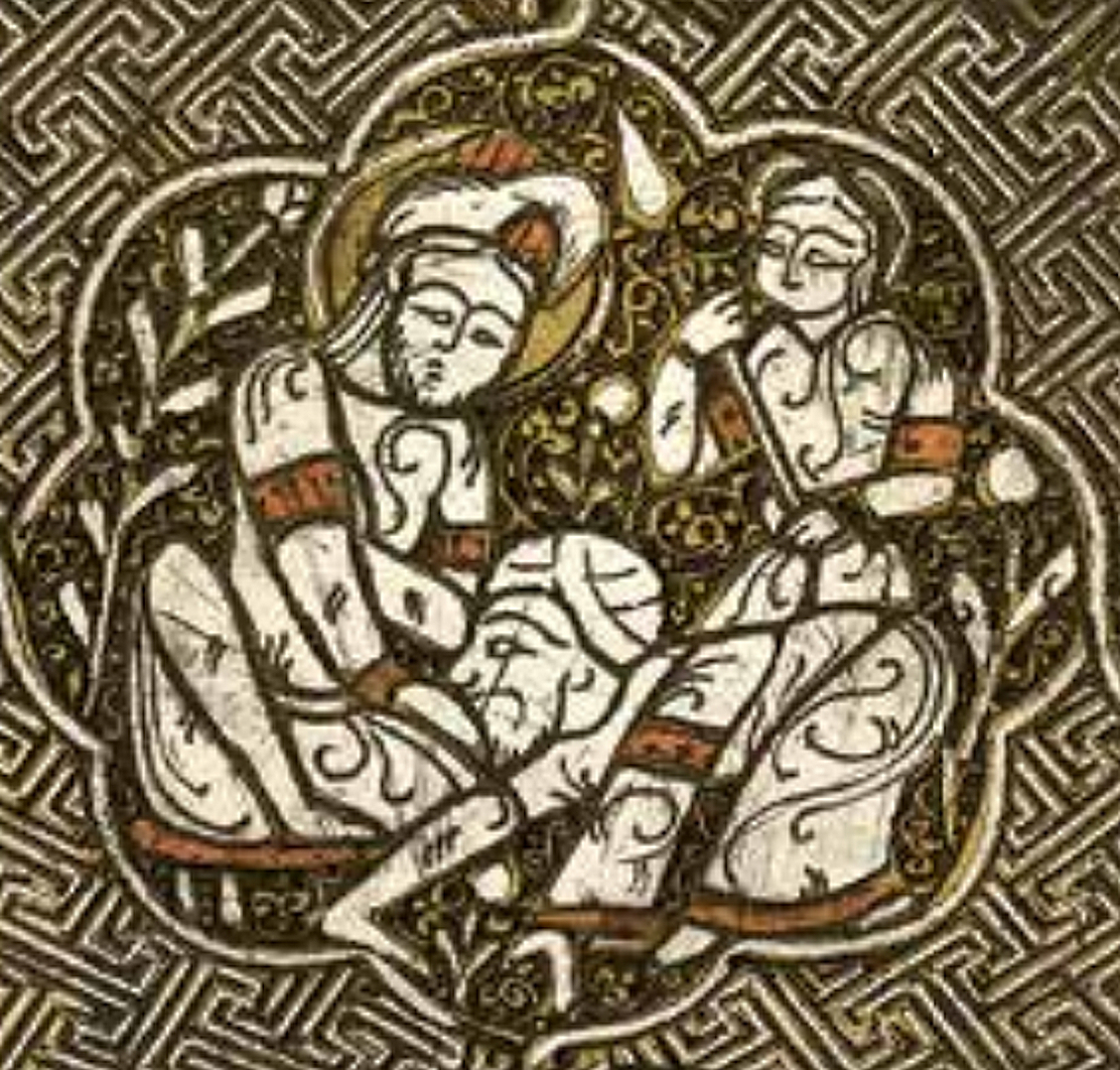
Blacas ewer, ruler wearing the Turkic hat sharbush, with attendants.

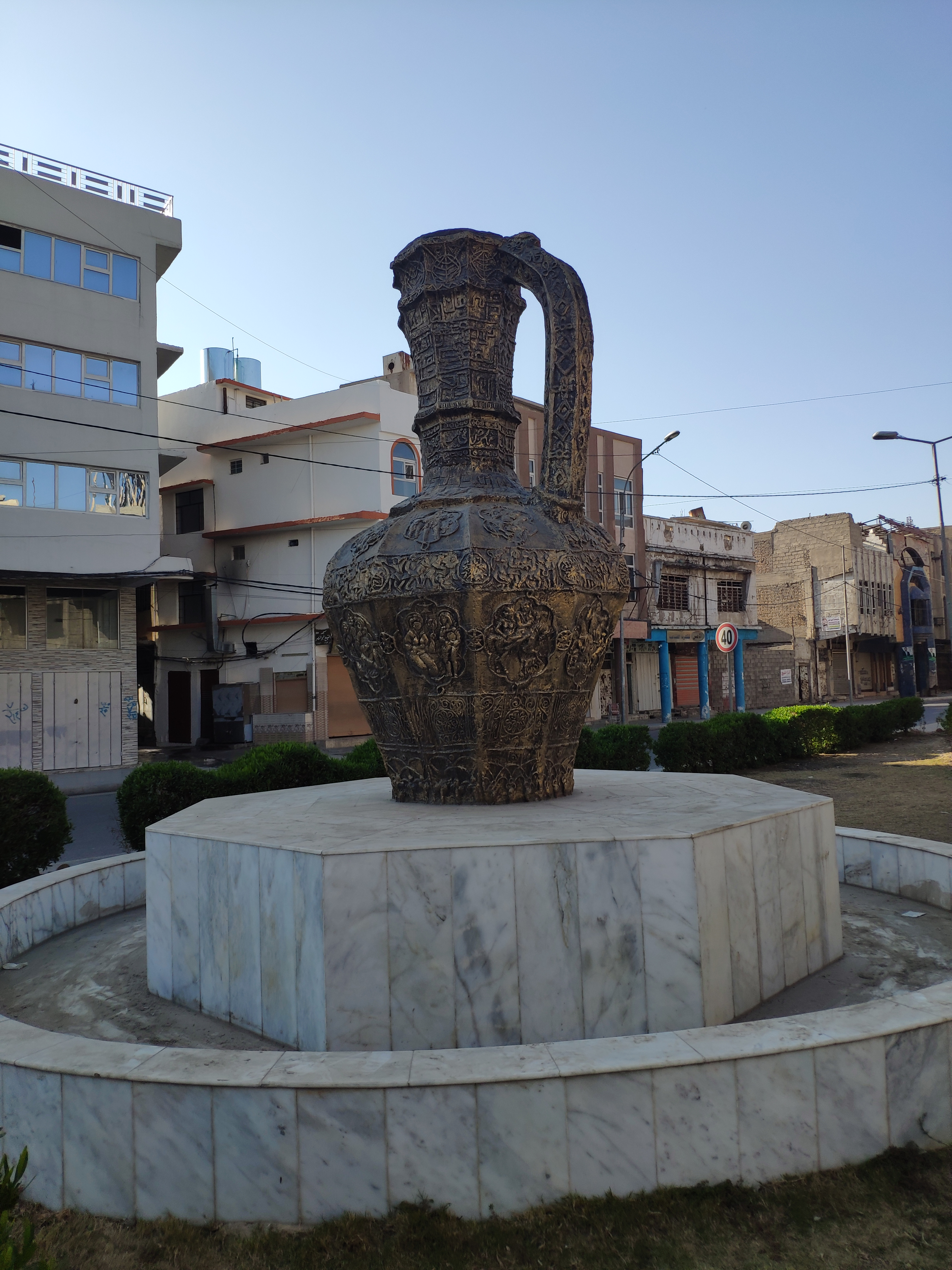
Sculpture of ewer, Mosul.
