= Gaston Migeon =

French historian (1861-1930)

Gustave Achille Gaston Migeon (25 May 1861, in Vincennes – 29 October 1930, in the 17th arrondissement of Paris) was a French historian of the arts of the world.

He was a curator in the Department of Middle Age art objects, Renaissance and modern times at the Louvre.

== Works ==
=== Books and exhibition catalogs ===
- Verneuil Maurice Pillard. – Étoffes japonaises tissées et brochées. Préface de Gaston Migeon. Paris : Librairie centrale des Beaux-Arts, [s. d.], 2 vol.
- Catalogue des faïences françaises et des grès allemands. Musée national du Louvre. Paris : Librairies-imprimeries réunies, 1870.
- 1900. L'Exposition rétrospective de l'art décoratif français. Paris : Manzi, Joyant et Cie, 1901.
- La Collection de M. Edmond Foulc. S. l., 1902.
- Le Legs Adolphe de Rothschild aux musées du Louvre et de Cluny. S. l., 1902.
- Exposition des arts musulmans [catalogue de l'exposition], Paris, musée des Arts décoratifs, 1903. Paris : H. Laurens, 1903; 2e éd. Paris : Société française d'imprimerie et de librairie, 1903.
- La Collection de M. Octave Homberg Manzi. Paris : Joyant, 1904.
- Catalogue des bronzes et cuivres du Moyen Âge, de la Renaissance et des Temps modernes. Paris : Motteroz, 1904.
- Fondation Eugène Piot. Deux œuvres de la Renaissance italienne (musée du Louvre). Paris : Ernest Leroux, 1905.
- Chef-d'œuvre d'art musulman. Paris : D.-A. Longuet, 1905.
- Le Caire, le Nil et Memphis. Paris : H. Laurens, 1906.
- Catalogue raisonné de la collection Martin Le Roy, collab. de Marquet de Vasselot Anatole, Koechlin Raymond, Metman Louis, Leprieur Paul, Pératé André, Lemoisne Paul-André. Chartres : imprimerie de Durand, 1906-1909, 5 vol.
- Bronzes et Objets divers, collab. de Marquet de Vasselot Jean-Joseph. Paris, 1907
- La Collection Kelekian. Étoffes et tapis d'Orient et de Venise. Paris : Librairie centrale des beaux-arts, 1907.
- Les Arts plastiques et industriels. Paris : Picard et fils, 1907.
- Les vitraux suisses au musée du Louvre, catalogue critique et raisonné. Paris : Eggimann, 1908.
- Manuel d'art musulman : arts plastiques et industriels. Paris : A. Picard, 1908, 2 vol.
- Au Japon, promenades aux sanctuaires de l'art. Paris : Hachette, 1908.
- La Collection Victor Gay aux musées nationaux. Paris, 1909.
- Les Arts du tissu. Paris : H. Laurens, 1909.
- Exposition de l'œuvre céramique du musée du potier Ernest Chaplet. Préface de Gaston Migeon. Paris, 1910.
- Figures en haut relief de pierre provenant du château d'Ecouen, s. l., 1910.
- Catalogue descriptif de l'exposition des faïences italiennes de la collection Imbert. Paris : Société Française d'Imprimerie, 1911.
- Musée du Louvre : Sculptures et objets d'art du Moyen Âge, de la Renaissance et des Temps modernes, collab. de Michel André. Paris : Librairie Renouard, 1912.
- Collection Paul Blanchet. objets d'art du Moyen Âge et de la Renaissance, collab. de Jules Guiffrey. Paris : G. Petit, 1913.
- Qeesejir Amra. Paris : Firmin Didot, 1914.
- Cristaux de roche, verres émaillés, céramiques, sculptures, bois sculptés, ivoires, bronzes, armes, cuivres, tapis, tissus, miniature. Paris : A. Morancé, Van Oest, 1914-1922.
- Catalogue de la collection Arconati Visconti. Paris : Hachette, 1917.
- Le Catalogue de la collection Paul Garnier. Paris : Hachette, 1917.
- Armes, sculpture, bois, ivoires, bronzes et cuivres, tapis, tissus, miniatures. Paris : Albert Morancé, 1921.
- L'Orient musulman : cristaux de roche, verres émaillés, céramique du musée du Louvre. Paris : Éditions Morancé, 1922.
- L'Orient musulman : sculptures, bois sculptés, ivoires, bronzes, armes, cuivres, tapis et tissus, miniatures. Paris : A. Morancé, 1922.
- Orfèvrerie d'argent de style oriental trouvée en Bulgarie. Paris : Paul Geuthner éditeur, 1922.
- Catalogue de la collection Isaac de Camondo : sculptures et objets d'art du Moyen Âge et de la Renaissance, peintures et dessins, mobilier et objets d'art des XVIIe et XVIIIe siècles, peintures, pastels, aquarelles et dessins du XIXe siècle, peintures, sculptures et objets d'art de l'Extrême-Orient. Paris : Gaston Braun, 1922.
- La Céramique d'Asie Mineure et de Constantinople du XIVe au XVIIIe siècle. Paris : Paul Geuthner, 1923.
- L'Estampe japonaise des XVIIe et XVIIIe siècles. Paris : Albert Morancé, 1923.
- Les Récentes Acquisitions du département des objets d'art du Moyen Âge, de la Renaissance et des Temps modernes. Paris : Renouard, Henri Laurens, 1923.
- L'Estampe japonaise du XVIIIe siècle au XIXe siècle. Paris : Albert Morancé, 1923.
- La Marquise Arconati Visconti. Notice lue à l'Assemblée générale annuelle de la Société des amis du Louvre. Paris, 1924.
- Peintres-voyageurs en Turquie au XVIIIe siècle. Paris : Paul Geuthner, 1924.
- Exposition d'art musulman : Alexandrie. Alexandrie : Les Amis de l'Art, 1925.
- L'Art chinois. Musée du Louvre. Paris : Albert Morancé, 1925.
- La Collection de Paul Mallon. Paris : P. Gauthner, 1925, 2 t.
- L'Œuvre d'un amateur d'art : la collection de M.-F. Engel-Gros. Genève : Éditions d'art Boissonnas, 1925.
- Les Arts musulmans. Paris, Bruxelles : G. Van Oest, 1926.
- L'Art japonais. Paris : A. Morancé, 1927.
- Orfèvrerie, Cuivres, Cristaux de roche, Verrerie, Céramique, Tissus, Tapis. Paris : Picard, 1927.
- Peinture et Miniature, Sculpture décorative monumentale et mobilière, Pierre, Stuc, Bois, Ivoires, Bronzes, Monnaies, Armes. Paris : Picard, 1927.
- Cent planches en couleurs d'art musulman, céramique, tissus, tapis. Paris : A. Lévy, Librairie centrale des Beaux-Arts, 1929.
- Gustave Dreyfus : notice lue à l'Assemblée générale annuelle de la Société des Amis du Louvre, le 5 février 1929. Paris, 1929.
- Les Collections de l'Extrême-Orient (Inde, Turkestan, Chine, Japon). Paris : Réunion des musées nationaux, 1929.
- Les Arts décoratifs musulmans. Paris : Morancé, 1929.
- Le Décor lustré dans la céramique musulmane : à propos de publications récentes. Paris : Paul Geuthner, 1929.
- Cent planches en couleur d'art musulman, céramiques, tissus et tapis. Paris : A. Lévy, 1928-1956.
- Les Collections du vieux Seraï à Istanbul. Paris : Paul Geuthner, 1930.
- Meubles et objets d'art de la collection Camondo. Paris : A. Lévy, 1910.

=== Articles ===
- « Le Musée Cernuschi ». Gazette des Beaux-Arts, 1897, p. 217-228.
- « Le Sculpteur Augustin Saint-Gaudens ». Art et Décoration, 1899, p. 43-49.
- « Les Cuivres arabes ». Gazette des Beaux-Arts, 1899, t. XXII, p. 462-474; 1900, t. XXIII, p. 119-131.
- « J.-C. Chaplain ». Art et Décoration, 1900, p. 97-104.
- « La Céramique orientale à reflets métalliques : à propos d'une acquisition récente du musée du Louvre ». Gazette des Beaux-Arts, 1901, p. 3-19.
- « Compte rendu de l'ouvrage de Henry Wallin. Early Italian Majolica publié chez Quaritech à Londres en 1901 ». Gazette des Beaux-Arts, t. I, 1901, p. 351.
- « L'Exposition rétrospective d'art religieux à Düsseldorf ». Gazette des Beaux-Arts, t. II, 1901, p. 208-222.
- « La Collection de M. Octave Homberg ». Les Arts, n° 36, 1904, p. 32-48.
- « La Collection Chabrières-Arlès ». Les Arts, n° 23, 1903, p. 8-16.
- « Récentes acquisitions du département des objets d'art au musée du Louvre ». Gazette des Beaux-Arts, 1905, p. 1-14,131-147.
- « Notes sur l'histoire du tissu au Japon ». Art et Décoration, janvier 1905, p. 89-98.
- « Notes d'archéologie musulmane à propos de nouvelles acquisitions du Louvre ». Gazette des Beaux-Arts, 1905, p. 441-445; 1913, p. 481-499.
- « Notes d'archéologie musulmane : monuments inédits ». Gazette des Beaux-Arts, 1906, p. 5-14.
- « Estampes japonaises ». Art et Décoration, 1914-1919, p. 33-48.
- « La Collection de M. Paul Garnier ». Les Arts, n° 51, mars 1906, p. 2-11,13-24.
- Migeon Gaston, Vitry Paul, Guiffrey Jules. – « La Collection de M. Gustave Dreyfus ». Les Arts, avril 1908, p. 1-32; janvier 1908, p. 16-32.
- « La Collection de M. Charles Mège ». Gazette des Beaux-Arts, février 1909, p. 1-19.
- « La Collection de M. Piet-Lataudrie ». Les Arts, n° 92, août 1909, 32 p.
- « La Collection Gayaux ». Gazette des Beaux-Arts, mai 1909, p. 408-432.
- « René Ménard ». Art et Décoration, 1902, p. 101-112.
- « La Collection Schlichting au musée du Louvre ». Gazette des Beaux-Arts, 1920, p. 385-404.
- « Les Grandes Ventes. Les collections d'art japonais de Louis Gonse ». La Revue d'art ancien et moderne, vol. XLV, janvier-mai 1924, p. 236-250.
- « Un essai de classement des tissus de soie et décors sassanides et byzantins ». Gazette des Beaux-Arts, 1925, p. 471-483.
- Migeon Gaston, Tiziac Henri (de), Alfassa Paul. – « Les Collections de M. Raymond Koechlin ». L'Amour de l'art, mars 1925, n° 3, p. 95-110.
- « Compte rendu de l'exposition d'art oriental à la Bibliothèque nationale ». Gazette des Beaux-Arts, 1925, p. 317-330.
- « Les Tissus de Perse antique et musulmane ». La Revue de l'art ancien et moderne, vol. LI, janvier-mai 1927, p. 95-108.
- « Les Tissus archaïques musulmans ». Art et Décoration, 1929, p. 141-144.
- « Le Décor lustré dans la céramique musulmane : à propos de publications récentes ». Syria, 1929, p. 130-136.
- « Fondation Eugène Piot : deux œuvres de la Renaissance italienne au musée du Louvre ». In Monuments et Mémoires publiés par l'Académie des inscriptions et belles-lettres, t. XII, fasc. 2, n. p.
- Koechlin Raymond. – Gaston Migeon et le Louvre : notice lue à l'assemblée générale annuelle de la Société des Amis du Louvre le 3 mars 1931. Paris, 1931.
- Koechlin Raymond. – Gaston Migeon et le Louvre : notice lue à l'Assemblée générale annuelle de la Société des Amis du Louvre. Paris : Lahure, 1931.
- Koechlin Raymond. – « Les Legs de M. Gaston Migeon au Louvre et au musée des Arts décoratifs ». Bulletin des musées de France, 1931, 2, p. 21-23.
- Tableaux modernes, sculptures, estampes composant la collection de M. Gaston Migeon dont la vente aura lieu les 18, 19, 20 et 21 mars 1931 à Paris, Hôtel Drouot. Paris : Lahure, 1931.
- Oudin Hubert. – Étude d'une personnalité du monde des musées : Gaston Migeon (1861-1930). Mémoire de l'École du Louvre, Paris, 1994.
- Friestedt Cédric. – Gaston Migeon et les Arts asiatiques. Mémoire de l'École du Louvre, Paris, 2004.
- Kling Marion. – Les Collections d'art japonais au musée du Louvre 1893-1914. Mémoire de l'École du Louvre, Paris, 2006.
